

110001–110100 

|-bgcolor=#d6d6d6
| 110001 ||  || — || September 17, 2001 || Socorro || LINEAR || HYG || align=right | 6.9 km || 
|-id=002 bgcolor=#E9E9E9
| 110002 ||  || — || September 17, 2001 || Socorro || LINEAR || — || align=right | 5.8 km || 
|-id=003 bgcolor=#E9E9E9
| 110003 ||  || — || September 17, 2001 || Socorro || LINEAR || — || align=right | 5.3 km || 
|-id=004 bgcolor=#E9E9E9
| 110004 ||  || — || September 17, 2001 || Socorro || LINEAR || — || align=right | 4.6 km || 
|-id=005 bgcolor=#E9E9E9
| 110005 ||  || — || September 17, 2001 || Socorro || LINEAR || — || align=right | 3.6 km || 
|-id=006 bgcolor=#E9E9E9
| 110006 ||  || — || September 17, 2001 || Socorro || LINEAR || MAR || align=right | 2.0 km || 
|-id=007 bgcolor=#E9E9E9
| 110007 ||  || — || September 17, 2001 || Socorro || LINEAR || — || align=right | 3.8 km || 
|-id=008 bgcolor=#E9E9E9
| 110008 ||  || — || September 17, 2001 || Socorro || LINEAR || PAD || align=right | 3.9 km || 
|-id=009 bgcolor=#E9E9E9
| 110009 ||  || — || September 17, 2001 || Socorro || LINEAR || — || align=right | 3.0 km || 
|-id=010 bgcolor=#E9E9E9
| 110010 ||  || — || September 17, 2001 || Socorro || LINEAR || — || align=right | 2.4 km || 
|-id=011 bgcolor=#E9E9E9
| 110011 ||  || — || September 17, 2001 || Socorro || LINEAR || — || align=right | 3.9 km || 
|-id=012 bgcolor=#E9E9E9
| 110012 ||  || — || September 17, 2001 || Socorro || LINEAR || — || align=right | 4.8 km || 
|-id=013 bgcolor=#E9E9E9
| 110013 ||  || — || September 17, 2001 || Socorro || LINEAR || — || align=right | 3.0 km || 
|-id=014 bgcolor=#E9E9E9
| 110014 ||  || — || September 17, 2001 || Socorro || LINEAR || — || align=right | 5.7 km || 
|-id=015 bgcolor=#E9E9E9
| 110015 ||  || — || September 17, 2001 || Socorro || LINEAR || — || align=right | 3.8 km || 
|-id=016 bgcolor=#E9E9E9
| 110016 ||  || — || September 17, 2001 || Socorro || LINEAR || — || align=right | 2.6 km || 
|-id=017 bgcolor=#E9E9E9
| 110017 ||  || — || September 17, 2001 || Socorro || LINEAR || RAF || align=right | 2.0 km || 
|-id=018 bgcolor=#E9E9E9
| 110018 ||  || — || September 17, 2001 || Socorro || LINEAR || MAR || align=right | 3.3 km || 
|-id=019 bgcolor=#E9E9E9
| 110019 ||  || — || September 17, 2001 || Socorro || LINEAR || — || align=right | 4.7 km || 
|-id=020 bgcolor=#fefefe
| 110020 ||  || — || September 17, 2001 || Socorro || LINEAR || — || align=right | 1.5 km || 
|-id=021 bgcolor=#fefefe
| 110021 ||  || — || September 17, 2001 || Socorro || LINEAR || V || align=right | 1.7 km || 
|-id=022 bgcolor=#E9E9E9
| 110022 ||  || — || September 17, 2001 || Socorro || LINEAR || EUN || align=right | 3.2 km || 
|-id=023 bgcolor=#d6d6d6
| 110023 ||  || — || September 17, 2001 || Socorro || LINEAR || — || align=right | 6.7 km || 
|-id=024 bgcolor=#E9E9E9
| 110024 ||  || — || September 17, 2001 || Socorro || LINEAR || — || align=right | 6.2 km || 
|-id=025 bgcolor=#E9E9E9
| 110025 ||  || — || September 17, 2001 || Socorro || LINEAR || — || align=right | 4.9 km || 
|-id=026 bgcolor=#d6d6d6
| 110026 Hamill ||  ||  || September 17, 2001 || Goodricke-Pigott || R. A. Tucker || — || align=right | 4.0 km || 
|-id=027 bgcolor=#d6d6d6
| 110027 ||  || — || September 19, 2001 || Anderson Mesa || LONEOS || EOS || align=right | 3.6 km || 
|-id=028 bgcolor=#E9E9E9
| 110028 ||  || — || September 19, 2001 || Anderson Mesa || LONEOS || — || align=right | 2.4 km || 
|-id=029 bgcolor=#E9E9E9
| 110029 ||  || — || September 19, 2001 || Anderson Mesa || LONEOS || — || align=right | 4.0 km || 
|-id=030 bgcolor=#d6d6d6
| 110030 ||  || — || September 19, 2001 || Anderson Mesa || LONEOS || ALA || align=right | 7.0 km || 
|-id=031 bgcolor=#d6d6d6
| 110031 ||  || — || September 19, 2001 || Anderson Mesa || LONEOS || — || align=right | 8.8 km || 
|-id=032 bgcolor=#E9E9E9
| 110032 ||  || — || September 19, 2001 || Anderson Mesa || LONEOS || — || align=right | 3.4 km || 
|-id=033 bgcolor=#d6d6d6
| 110033 ||  || — || September 16, 2001 || Socorro || LINEAR || EOS || align=right | 3.6 km || 
|-id=034 bgcolor=#fefefe
| 110034 ||  || — || September 16, 2001 || Socorro || LINEAR || — || align=right | 1.2 km || 
|-id=035 bgcolor=#E9E9E9
| 110035 ||  || — || September 19, 2001 || Socorro || LINEAR || — || align=right | 5.8 km || 
|-id=036 bgcolor=#d6d6d6
| 110036 ||  || — || September 20, 2001 || Socorro || LINEAR || — || align=right | 3.7 km || 
|-id=037 bgcolor=#fefefe
| 110037 ||  || — || September 20, 2001 || Socorro || LINEAR || — || align=right | 1.7 km || 
|-id=038 bgcolor=#E9E9E9
| 110038 ||  || — || September 20, 2001 || Socorro || LINEAR || RAF || align=right | 1.6 km || 
|-id=039 bgcolor=#E9E9E9
| 110039 ||  || — || September 20, 2001 || Socorro || LINEAR || — || align=right | 1.6 km || 
|-id=040 bgcolor=#fefefe
| 110040 ||  || — || September 20, 2001 || Socorro || LINEAR || — || align=right | 1.7 km || 
|-id=041 bgcolor=#E9E9E9
| 110041 ||  || — || September 20, 2001 || Socorro || LINEAR || — || align=right | 2.7 km || 
|-id=042 bgcolor=#d6d6d6
| 110042 ||  || — || September 20, 2001 || Socorro || LINEAR || — || align=right | 4.1 km || 
|-id=043 bgcolor=#E9E9E9
| 110043 ||  || — || September 20, 2001 || Socorro || LINEAR || — || align=right | 3.2 km || 
|-id=044 bgcolor=#fefefe
| 110044 ||  || — || September 20, 2001 || Socorro || LINEAR || V || align=right | 1.1 km || 
|-id=045 bgcolor=#E9E9E9
| 110045 ||  || — || September 20, 2001 || Socorro || LINEAR || — || align=right | 4.6 km || 
|-id=046 bgcolor=#fefefe
| 110046 ||  || — || September 20, 2001 || Socorro || LINEAR || — || align=right | 1.2 km || 
|-id=047 bgcolor=#E9E9E9
| 110047 ||  || — || September 20, 2001 || Socorro || LINEAR || — || align=right | 1.4 km || 
|-id=048 bgcolor=#E9E9E9
| 110048 ||  || — || September 20, 2001 || Socorro || LINEAR || — || align=right | 3.7 km || 
|-id=049 bgcolor=#E9E9E9
| 110049 ||  || — || September 20, 2001 || Socorro || LINEAR || RAF || align=right | 1.7 km || 
|-id=050 bgcolor=#E9E9E9
| 110050 ||  || — || September 20, 2001 || Socorro || LINEAR || — || align=right | 4.1 km || 
|-id=051 bgcolor=#fefefe
| 110051 ||  || — || September 20, 2001 || Socorro || LINEAR || V || align=right | 1.8 km || 
|-id=052 bgcolor=#E9E9E9
| 110052 ||  || — || September 20, 2001 || Socorro || LINEAR || — || align=right | 2.8 km || 
|-id=053 bgcolor=#d6d6d6
| 110053 ||  || — || September 20, 2001 || Socorro || LINEAR || — || align=right | 4.6 km || 
|-id=054 bgcolor=#E9E9E9
| 110054 ||  || — || September 20, 2001 || Socorro || LINEAR || EUN || align=right | 2.3 km || 
|-id=055 bgcolor=#d6d6d6
| 110055 ||  || — || September 20, 2001 || Socorro || LINEAR || — || align=right | 4.0 km || 
|-id=056 bgcolor=#d6d6d6
| 110056 ||  || — || September 20, 2001 || Socorro || LINEAR || EUP || align=right | 5.2 km || 
|-id=057 bgcolor=#E9E9E9
| 110057 ||  || — || September 20, 2001 || Socorro || LINEAR || — || align=right | 2.5 km || 
|-id=058 bgcolor=#E9E9E9
| 110058 ||  || — || September 20, 2001 || Socorro || LINEAR || — || align=right | 3.9 km || 
|-id=059 bgcolor=#E9E9E9
| 110059 ||  || — || September 20, 2001 || Socorro || LINEAR || slow || align=right | 5.0 km || 
|-id=060 bgcolor=#E9E9E9
| 110060 ||  || — || September 20, 2001 || Socorro || LINEAR || RAF || align=right | 3.0 km || 
|-id=061 bgcolor=#E9E9E9
| 110061 ||  || — || September 20, 2001 || Socorro || LINEAR || — || align=right | 5.1 km || 
|-id=062 bgcolor=#E9E9E9
| 110062 ||  || — || September 20, 2001 || Socorro || LINEAR || — || align=right | 2.7 km || 
|-id=063 bgcolor=#E9E9E9
| 110063 ||  || — || September 20, 2001 || Socorro || LINEAR || — || align=right | 5.5 km || 
|-id=064 bgcolor=#E9E9E9
| 110064 ||  || — || September 20, 2001 || Socorro || LINEAR || GEF || align=right | 3.1 km || 
|-id=065 bgcolor=#d6d6d6
| 110065 ||  || — || September 20, 2001 || Socorro || LINEAR || ALA || align=right | 11 km || 
|-id=066 bgcolor=#d6d6d6
| 110066 ||  || — || September 20, 2001 || Socorro || LINEAR || — || align=right | 5.3 km || 
|-id=067 bgcolor=#d6d6d6
| 110067 ||  || — || September 20, 2001 || Socorro || LINEAR || — || align=right | 3.7 km || 
|-id=068 bgcolor=#E9E9E9
| 110068 ||  || — || September 20, 2001 || Socorro || LINEAR || — || align=right | 1.9 km || 
|-id=069 bgcolor=#E9E9E9
| 110069 ||  || — || September 20, 2001 || Socorro || LINEAR || GEF || align=right | 2.9 km || 
|-id=070 bgcolor=#E9E9E9
| 110070 ||  || — || September 20, 2001 || Socorro || LINEAR || DOR || align=right | 7.6 km || 
|-id=071 bgcolor=#E9E9E9
| 110071 ||  || — || September 20, 2001 || Socorro || LINEAR || — || align=right | 5.4 km || 
|-id=072 bgcolor=#fefefe
| 110072 ||  || — || September 20, 2001 || Socorro || LINEAR || — || align=right | 2.7 km || 
|-id=073 bgcolor=#E9E9E9
| 110073 Leeonki ||  ||  || September 20, 2001 || Desert Eagle || W. K. Y. Yeung || PAD || align=right | 4.2 km || 
|-id=074 bgcolor=#E9E9E9
| 110074 Lamchunhei ||  ||  || September 20, 2001 || Desert Eagle || W. K. Y. Yeung || — || align=right | 1.7 km || 
|-id=075 bgcolor=#fefefe
| 110075 ||  || — || September 20, 2001 || Desert Eagle || W. K. Y. Yeung || — || align=right | 1.7 km || 
|-id=076 bgcolor=#E9E9E9
| 110076 ||  || — || September 20, 2001 || Desert Eagle || W. K. Y. Yeung || — || align=right | 2.5 km || 
|-id=077 bgcolor=#E9E9E9
| 110077 Pujiquanshan ||  ||  || September 20, 2001 || Desert Eagle || W. K. Y. Yeung || — || align=right | 2.1 km || 
|-id=078 bgcolor=#d6d6d6
| 110078 ||  || — || September 20, 2001 || Desert Eagle || W. K. Y. Yeung || — || align=right | 6.7 km || 
|-id=079 bgcolor=#E9E9E9
| 110079 ||  || — || September 20, 2001 || Desert Eagle || W. K. Y. Yeung || — || align=right | 2.0 km || 
|-id=080 bgcolor=#E9E9E9
| 110080 ||  || — || September 20, 2001 || Desert Eagle || W. K. Y. Yeung || — || align=right | 4.4 km || 
|-id=081 bgcolor=#E9E9E9
| 110081 ||  || — || September 20, 2001 || Desert Eagle || W. K. Y. Yeung || — || align=right | 4.0 km || 
|-id=082 bgcolor=#E9E9E9
| 110082 ||  || — || September 18, 2001 || Desert Eagle || W. K. Y. Yeung || — || align=right | 3.3 km || 
|-id=083 bgcolor=#FA8072
| 110083 ||  || — || September 20, 2001 || Socorro || LINEAR || — || align=right | 2.1 km || 
|-id=084 bgcolor=#d6d6d6
| 110084 ||  || — || September 16, 2001 || Socorro || LINEAR || CHA || align=right | 4.6 km || 
|-id=085 bgcolor=#E9E9E9
| 110085 ||  || — || September 16, 2001 || Socorro || LINEAR || — || align=right | 2.1 km || 
|-id=086 bgcolor=#E9E9E9
| 110086 ||  || — || September 16, 2001 || Socorro || LINEAR || — || align=right | 2.7 km || 
|-id=087 bgcolor=#E9E9E9
| 110087 ||  || — || September 16, 2001 || Socorro || LINEAR || JUN || align=right | 2.0 km || 
|-id=088 bgcolor=#E9E9E9
| 110088 ||  || — || September 16, 2001 || Socorro || LINEAR || — || align=right | 3.1 km || 
|-id=089 bgcolor=#E9E9E9
| 110089 ||  || — || September 16, 2001 || Socorro || LINEAR || WIT || align=right | 1.6 km || 
|-id=090 bgcolor=#E9E9E9
| 110090 ||  || — || September 16, 2001 || Socorro || LINEAR || — || align=right | 2.4 km || 
|-id=091 bgcolor=#fefefe
| 110091 ||  || — || September 16, 2001 || Socorro || LINEAR || — || align=right | 5.2 km || 
|-id=092 bgcolor=#E9E9E9
| 110092 ||  || — || September 16, 2001 || Socorro || LINEAR || — || align=right | 2.2 km || 
|-id=093 bgcolor=#E9E9E9
| 110093 ||  || — || September 16, 2001 || Socorro || LINEAR || RAF || align=right | 5.0 km || 
|-id=094 bgcolor=#E9E9E9
| 110094 ||  || — || September 16, 2001 || Socorro || LINEAR || — || align=right | 5.7 km || 
|-id=095 bgcolor=#E9E9E9
| 110095 ||  || — || September 16, 2001 || Socorro || LINEAR || — || align=right | 2.3 km || 
|-id=096 bgcolor=#d6d6d6
| 110096 ||  || — || September 16, 2001 || Socorro || LINEAR || EOS || align=right | 3.8 km || 
|-id=097 bgcolor=#d6d6d6
| 110097 ||  || — || September 16, 2001 || Socorro || LINEAR || EOS || align=right | 4.7 km || 
|-id=098 bgcolor=#E9E9E9
| 110098 ||  || — || September 16, 2001 || Socorro || LINEAR || — || align=right | 3.9 km || 
|-id=099 bgcolor=#d6d6d6
| 110099 ||  || — || September 16, 2001 || Socorro || LINEAR || — || align=right | 5.0 km || 
|-id=100 bgcolor=#E9E9E9
| 110100 ||  || — || September 16, 2001 || Socorro || LINEAR || — || align=right | 2.8 km || 
|}

110101–110200 

|-bgcolor=#E9E9E9
| 110101 ||  || — || September 16, 2001 || Socorro || LINEAR || — || align=right | 2.3 km || 
|-id=102 bgcolor=#E9E9E9
| 110102 ||  || — || September 16, 2001 || Socorro || LINEAR || — || align=right | 1.8 km || 
|-id=103 bgcolor=#d6d6d6
| 110103 ||  || — || September 16, 2001 || Socorro || LINEAR || — || align=right | 5.8 km || 
|-id=104 bgcolor=#d6d6d6
| 110104 ||  || — || September 16, 2001 || Socorro || LINEAR || — || align=right | 5.7 km || 
|-id=105 bgcolor=#E9E9E9
| 110105 ||  || — || September 16, 2001 || Socorro || LINEAR || — || align=right | 4.3 km || 
|-id=106 bgcolor=#fefefe
| 110106 ||  || — || September 16, 2001 || Socorro || LINEAR || NYS || align=right | 4.3 km || 
|-id=107 bgcolor=#E9E9E9
| 110107 ||  || — || September 16, 2001 || Socorro || LINEAR || — || align=right | 2.1 km || 
|-id=108 bgcolor=#d6d6d6
| 110108 ||  || — || September 16, 2001 || Socorro || LINEAR || HYG || align=right | 4.3 km || 
|-id=109 bgcolor=#E9E9E9
| 110109 ||  || — || September 16, 2001 || Socorro || LINEAR || — || align=right | 5.1 km || 
|-id=110 bgcolor=#E9E9E9
| 110110 ||  || — || September 16, 2001 || Socorro || LINEAR || — || align=right | 1.8 km || 
|-id=111 bgcolor=#d6d6d6
| 110111 ||  || — || September 16, 2001 || Socorro || LINEAR || — || align=right | 3.5 km || 
|-id=112 bgcolor=#d6d6d6
| 110112 ||  || — || September 16, 2001 || Socorro || LINEAR || 3:2 || align=right | 7.5 km || 
|-id=113 bgcolor=#E9E9E9
| 110113 ||  || — || September 16, 2001 || Socorro || LINEAR || — || align=right | 1.8 km || 
|-id=114 bgcolor=#E9E9E9
| 110114 ||  || — || September 16, 2001 || Socorro || LINEAR || — || align=right | 2.8 km || 
|-id=115 bgcolor=#d6d6d6
| 110115 ||  || — || September 16, 2001 || Socorro || LINEAR || HYG || align=right | 6.4 km || 
|-id=116 bgcolor=#E9E9E9
| 110116 ||  || — || September 16, 2001 || Socorro || LINEAR || — || align=right | 2.5 km || 
|-id=117 bgcolor=#E9E9E9
| 110117 ||  || — || September 16, 2001 || Socorro || LINEAR || — || align=right | 3.1 km || 
|-id=118 bgcolor=#E9E9E9
| 110118 ||  || — || September 16, 2001 || Socorro || LINEAR || — || align=right | 3.6 km || 
|-id=119 bgcolor=#E9E9E9
| 110119 ||  || — || September 16, 2001 || Socorro || LINEAR || slow || align=right | 2.6 km || 
|-id=120 bgcolor=#E9E9E9
| 110120 ||  || — || September 16, 2001 || Socorro || LINEAR || — || align=right | 2.5 km || 
|-id=121 bgcolor=#d6d6d6
| 110121 ||  || — || September 16, 2001 || Socorro || LINEAR || — || align=right | 4.8 km || 
|-id=122 bgcolor=#E9E9E9
| 110122 ||  || — || September 16, 2001 || Socorro || LINEAR || — || align=right | 4.7 km || 
|-id=123 bgcolor=#E9E9E9
| 110123 ||  || — || September 16, 2001 || Socorro || LINEAR || — || align=right | 2.7 km || 
|-id=124 bgcolor=#E9E9E9
| 110124 ||  || — || September 16, 2001 || Socorro || LINEAR || — || align=right | 2.5 km || 
|-id=125 bgcolor=#d6d6d6
| 110125 ||  || — || September 16, 2001 || Socorro || LINEAR || — || align=right | 4.1 km || 
|-id=126 bgcolor=#E9E9E9
| 110126 ||  || — || September 16, 2001 || Socorro || LINEAR || EUN || align=right | 2.5 km || 
|-id=127 bgcolor=#E9E9E9
| 110127 ||  || — || September 16, 2001 || Socorro || LINEAR || — || align=right | 3.5 km || 
|-id=128 bgcolor=#E9E9E9
| 110128 ||  || — || September 16, 2001 || Socorro || LINEAR || NEM || align=right | 5.1 km || 
|-id=129 bgcolor=#E9E9E9
| 110129 ||  || — || September 16, 2001 || Socorro || LINEAR || — || align=right | 4.9 km || 
|-id=130 bgcolor=#E9E9E9
| 110130 ||  || — || September 17, 2001 || Socorro || LINEAR || — || align=right | 5.3 km || 
|-id=131 bgcolor=#E9E9E9
| 110131 ||  || — || September 17, 2001 || Socorro || LINEAR || WIT || align=right | 1.9 km || 
|-id=132 bgcolor=#d6d6d6
| 110132 ||  || — || September 17, 2001 || Socorro || LINEAR || — || align=right | 6.6 km || 
|-id=133 bgcolor=#fefefe
| 110133 ||  || — || September 17, 2001 || Socorro || LINEAR || — || align=right | 2.0 km || 
|-id=134 bgcolor=#fefefe
| 110134 ||  || — || September 17, 2001 || Socorro || LINEAR || — || align=right | 1.9 km || 
|-id=135 bgcolor=#E9E9E9
| 110135 ||  || — || September 17, 2001 || Socorro || LINEAR || — || align=right | 2.8 km || 
|-id=136 bgcolor=#E9E9E9
| 110136 ||  || — || September 17, 2001 || Socorro || LINEAR || PAD || align=right | 3.0 km || 
|-id=137 bgcolor=#E9E9E9
| 110137 ||  || — || September 17, 2001 || Socorro || LINEAR || — || align=right | 2.2 km || 
|-id=138 bgcolor=#E9E9E9
| 110138 ||  || — || September 17, 2001 || Socorro || LINEAR || HNS || align=right | 2.8 km || 
|-id=139 bgcolor=#d6d6d6
| 110139 ||  || — || September 17, 2001 || Socorro || LINEAR || — || align=right | 6.9 km || 
|-id=140 bgcolor=#d6d6d6
| 110140 ||  || — || September 17, 2001 || Socorro || LINEAR || — || align=right | 7.1 km || 
|-id=141 bgcolor=#d6d6d6
| 110141 ||  || — || September 17, 2001 || Socorro || LINEAR || — || align=right | 5.6 km || 
|-id=142 bgcolor=#E9E9E9
| 110142 ||  || — || September 17, 2001 || Socorro || LINEAR || — || align=right | 4.5 km || 
|-id=143 bgcolor=#E9E9E9
| 110143 ||  || — || September 17, 2001 || Socorro || LINEAR || — || align=right | 2.9 km || 
|-id=144 bgcolor=#E9E9E9
| 110144 ||  || — || September 17, 2001 || Socorro || LINEAR || NEM || align=right | 3.8 km || 
|-id=145 bgcolor=#fefefe
| 110145 ||  || — || September 17, 2001 || Socorro || LINEAR || V || align=right | 1.5 km || 
|-id=146 bgcolor=#E9E9E9
| 110146 ||  || — || September 17, 2001 || Socorro || LINEAR || — || align=right | 1.3 km || 
|-id=147 bgcolor=#E9E9E9
| 110147 ||  || — || September 17, 2001 || Socorro || LINEAR || EUN || align=right | 2.3 km || 
|-id=148 bgcolor=#d6d6d6
| 110148 ||  || — || September 17, 2001 || Socorro || LINEAR || KOR || align=right | 2.9 km || 
|-id=149 bgcolor=#E9E9E9
| 110149 ||  || — || September 17, 2001 || Socorro || LINEAR || — || align=right | 2.1 km || 
|-id=150 bgcolor=#E9E9E9
| 110150 ||  || — || September 17, 2001 || Socorro || LINEAR || — || align=right | 3.2 km || 
|-id=151 bgcolor=#fefefe
| 110151 ||  || — || September 17, 2001 || Socorro || LINEAR || — || align=right | 1.9 km || 
|-id=152 bgcolor=#d6d6d6
| 110152 ||  || — || September 17, 2001 || Socorro || LINEAR || — || align=right | 4.1 km || 
|-id=153 bgcolor=#d6d6d6
| 110153 ||  || — || September 17, 2001 || Socorro || LINEAR || — || align=right | 7.5 km || 
|-id=154 bgcolor=#E9E9E9
| 110154 ||  || — || September 17, 2001 || Socorro || LINEAR || — || align=right | 4.8 km || 
|-id=155 bgcolor=#E9E9E9
| 110155 ||  || — || September 17, 2001 || Socorro || LINEAR || — || align=right | 2.9 km || 
|-id=156 bgcolor=#E9E9E9
| 110156 ||  || — || September 17, 2001 || Socorro || LINEAR || — || align=right | 3.7 km || 
|-id=157 bgcolor=#E9E9E9
| 110157 ||  || — || September 17, 2001 || Socorro || LINEAR || — || align=right | 2.7 km || 
|-id=158 bgcolor=#fefefe
| 110158 ||  || — || September 17, 2001 || Socorro || LINEAR || V || align=right | 1.4 km || 
|-id=159 bgcolor=#E9E9E9
| 110159 ||  || — || September 17, 2001 || Socorro || LINEAR || AGN || align=right | 2.2 km || 
|-id=160 bgcolor=#fefefe
| 110160 ||  || — || September 17, 2001 || Socorro || LINEAR || MAS || align=right | 1.5 km || 
|-id=161 bgcolor=#E9E9E9
| 110161 ||  || — || September 17, 2001 || Socorro || LINEAR || — || align=right | 3.4 km || 
|-id=162 bgcolor=#E9E9E9
| 110162 ||  || — || September 17, 2001 || Socorro || LINEAR || HOF || align=right | 3.8 km || 
|-id=163 bgcolor=#E9E9E9
| 110163 ||  || — || September 17, 2001 || Socorro || LINEAR || — || align=right | 2.1 km || 
|-id=164 bgcolor=#E9E9E9
| 110164 ||  || — || September 17, 2001 || Socorro || LINEAR || — || align=right | 3.8 km || 
|-id=165 bgcolor=#E9E9E9
| 110165 ||  || — || September 19, 2001 || Socorro || LINEAR || — || align=right | 3.0 km || 
|-id=166 bgcolor=#E9E9E9
| 110166 ||  || — || September 19, 2001 || Socorro || LINEAR || EUN || align=right | 2.3 km || 
|-id=167 bgcolor=#d6d6d6
| 110167 ||  || — || September 19, 2001 || Socorro || LINEAR || — || align=right | 5.8 km || 
|-id=168 bgcolor=#E9E9E9
| 110168 ||  || — || September 19, 2001 || Socorro || LINEAR || — || align=right | 3.7 km || 
|-id=169 bgcolor=#E9E9E9
| 110169 ||  || — || September 19, 2001 || Socorro || LINEAR || — || align=right | 3.4 km || 
|-id=170 bgcolor=#d6d6d6
| 110170 ||  || — || September 16, 2001 || Socorro || LINEAR || — || align=right | 4.3 km || 
|-id=171 bgcolor=#d6d6d6
| 110171 ||  || — || September 16, 2001 || Socorro || LINEAR || — || align=right | 8.2 km || 
|-id=172 bgcolor=#d6d6d6
| 110172 ||  || — || September 16, 2001 || Socorro || LINEAR || — || align=right | 7.1 km || 
|-id=173 bgcolor=#E9E9E9
| 110173 ||  || — || September 16, 2001 || Socorro || LINEAR || — || align=right | 2.7 km || 
|-id=174 bgcolor=#E9E9E9
| 110174 ||  || — || September 16, 2001 || Socorro || LINEAR || WIT || align=right | 1.8 km || 
|-id=175 bgcolor=#E9E9E9
| 110175 ||  || — || September 16, 2001 || Socorro || LINEAR || — || align=right | 5.5 km || 
|-id=176 bgcolor=#E9E9E9
| 110176 ||  || — || September 16, 2001 || Socorro || LINEAR || — || align=right | 2.4 km || 
|-id=177 bgcolor=#E9E9E9
| 110177 ||  || — || September 16, 2001 || Socorro || LINEAR || GEF || align=right | 2.4 km || 
|-id=178 bgcolor=#E9E9E9
| 110178 ||  || — || September 16, 2001 || Socorro || LINEAR || — || align=right | 3.1 km || 
|-id=179 bgcolor=#E9E9E9
| 110179 ||  || — || September 16, 2001 || Socorro || LINEAR || — || align=right | 2.9 km || 
|-id=180 bgcolor=#E9E9E9
| 110180 ||  || — || September 16, 2001 || Socorro || LINEAR || — || align=right | 2.3 km || 
|-id=181 bgcolor=#d6d6d6
| 110181 ||  || — || September 16, 2001 || Socorro || LINEAR || VER || align=right | 6.0 km || 
|-id=182 bgcolor=#E9E9E9
| 110182 ||  || — || September 16, 2001 || Socorro || LINEAR || — || align=right | 2.4 km || 
|-id=183 bgcolor=#E9E9E9
| 110183 ||  || — || September 16, 2001 || Socorro || LINEAR || — || align=right | 1.5 km || 
|-id=184 bgcolor=#E9E9E9
| 110184 ||  || — || September 16, 2001 || Socorro || LINEAR || — || align=right | 1.8 km || 
|-id=185 bgcolor=#E9E9E9
| 110185 ||  || — || September 16, 2001 || Socorro || LINEAR || — || align=right | 1.7 km || 
|-id=186 bgcolor=#E9E9E9
| 110186 ||  || — || September 17, 2001 || Socorro || LINEAR || — || align=right | 2.8 km || 
|-id=187 bgcolor=#d6d6d6
| 110187 ||  || — || September 17, 2001 || Socorro || LINEAR || — || align=right | 5.8 km || 
|-id=188 bgcolor=#d6d6d6
| 110188 ||  || — || September 17, 2001 || Socorro || LINEAR || — || align=right | 5.2 km || 
|-id=189 bgcolor=#E9E9E9
| 110189 ||  || — || September 17, 2001 || Socorro || LINEAR || CLO || align=right | 7.2 km || 
|-id=190 bgcolor=#E9E9E9
| 110190 ||  || — || September 17, 2001 || Socorro || LINEAR || — || align=right | 4.3 km || 
|-id=191 bgcolor=#E9E9E9
| 110191 ||  || — || September 19, 2001 || Socorro || LINEAR || — || align=right | 2.0 km || 
|-id=192 bgcolor=#d6d6d6
| 110192 ||  || — || September 19, 2001 || Socorro || LINEAR || — || align=right | 7.0 km || 
|-id=193 bgcolor=#d6d6d6
| 110193 ||  || — || September 19, 2001 || Socorro || LINEAR || THM || align=right | 4.4 km || 
|-id=194 bgcolor=#d6d6d6
| 110194 ||  || — || September 19, 2001 || Socorro || LINEAR || THM || align=right | 4.8 km || 
|-id=195 bgcolor=#d6d6d6
| 110195 ||  || — || September 19, 2001 || Socorro || LINEAR || THM || align=right | 4.8 km || 
|-id=196 bgcolor=#E9E9E9
| 110196 ||  || — || September 19, 2001 || Socorro || LINEAR || HEN || align=right | 1.6 km || 
|-id=197 bgcolor=#d6d6d6
| 110197 ||  || — || September 19, 2001 || Socorro || LINEAR || — || align=right | 5.5 km || 
|-id=198 bgcolor=#d6d6d6
| 110198 ||  || — || September 19, 2001 || Socorro || LINEAR || 7:4 || align=right | 8.3 km || 
|-id=199 bgcolor=#E9E9E9
| 110199 ||  || — || September 19, 2001 || Socorro || LINEAR || — || align=right | 3.4 km || 
|-id=200 bgcolor=#E9E9E9
| 110200 ||  || — || September 19, 2001 || Socorro || LINEAR || — || align=right | 1.7 km || 
|}

110201–110300 

|-bgcolor=#E9E9E9
| 110201 ||  || — || September 19, 2001 || Socorro || LINEAR || HNS || align=right | 2.2 km || 
|-id=202 bgcolor=#E9E9E9
| 110202 ||  || — || September 19, 2001 || Socorro || LINEAR || — || align=right | 1.6 km || 
|-id=203 bgcolor=#d6d6d6
| 110203 ||  || — || September 19, 2001 || Socorro || LINEAR || — || align=right | 3.8 km || 
|-id=204 bgcolor=#E9E9E9
| 110204 ||  || — || September 19, 2001 || Socorro || LINEAR || — || align=right | 2.3 km || 
|-id=205 bgcolor=#d6d6d6
| 110205 ||  || — || September 19, 2001 || Socorro || LINEAR || 7:4 || align=right | 8.5 km || 
|-id=206 bgcolor=#E9E9E9
| 110206 ||  || — || September 19, 2001 || Socorro || LINEAR || — || align=right | 4.7 km || 
|-id=207 bgcolor=#E9E9E9
| 110207 ||  || — || September 19, 2001 || Socorro || LINEAR || — || align=right | 2.0 km || 
|-id=208 bgcolor=#fefefe
| 110208 ||  || — || September 19, 2001 || Socorro || LINEAR || — || align=right | 1.7 km || 
|-id=209 bgcolor=#E9E9E9
| 110209 ||  || — || September 19, 2001 || Socorro || LINEAR || HOF || align=right | 4.6 km || 
|-id=210 bgcolor=#E9E9E9
| 110210 ||  || — || September 19, 2001 || Socorro || LINEAR || — || align=right | 3.6 km || 
|-id=211 bgcolor=#d6d6d6
| 110211 ||  || — || September 19, 2001 || Socorro || LINEAR || VER || align=right | 6.3 km || 
|-id=212 bgcolor=#E9E9E9
| 110212 ||  || — || September 19, 2001 || Socorro || LINEAR || GEF || align=right | 3.0 km || 
|-id=213 bgcolor=#E9E9E9
| 110213 ||  || — || September 19, 2001 || Socorro || LINEAR || WIT || align=right | 1.8 km || 
|-id=214 bgcolor=#d6d6d6
| 110214 ||  || — || September 19, 2001 || Socorro || LINEAR || EOS || align=right | 3.6 km || 
|-id=215 bgcolor=#d6d6d6
| 110215 ||  || — || September 19, 2001 || Socorro || LINEAR || THM || align=right | 3.3 km || 
|-id=216 bgcolor=#d6d6d6
| 110216 ||  || — || September 19, 2001 || Socorro || LINEAR || — || align=right | 4.5 km || 
|-id=217 bgcolor=#E9E9E9
| 110217 ||  || — || September 19, 2001 || Socorro || LINEAR || — || align=right | 2.7 km || 
|-id=218 bgcolor=#fefefe
| 110218 ||  || — || September 19, 2001 || Socorro || LINEAR || — || align=right | 1.9 km || 
|-id=219 bgcolor=#E9E9E9
| 110219 ||  || — || September 19, 2001 || Socorro || LINEAR || — || align=right | 2.6 km || 
|-id=220 bgcolor=#d6d6d6
| 110220 ||  || — || September 19, 2001 || Socorro || LINEAR || — || align=right | 5.3 km || 
|-id=221 bgcolor=#E9E9E9
| 110221 ||  || — || September 19, 2001 || Socorro || LINEAR || GEF || align=right | 5.6 km || 
|-id=222 bgcolor=#d6d6d6
| 110222 ||  || — || September 19, 2001 || Socorro || LINEAR || THM || align=right | 3.6 km || 
|-id=223 bgcolor=#E9E9E9
| 110223 ||  || — || September 19, 2001 || Socorro || LINEAR || — || align=right | 2.7 km || 
|-id=224 bgcolor=#d6d6d6
| 110224 ||  || — || September 19, 2001 || Socorro || LINEAR || — || align=right | 6.6 km || 
|-id=225 bgcolor=#E9E9E9
| 110225 ||  || — || September 19, 2001 || Socorro || LINEAR || — || align=right | 1.5 km || 
|-id=226 bgcolor=#E9E9E9
| 110226 ||  || — || September 19, 2001 || Socorro || LINEAR || — || align=right | 1.9 km || 
|-id=227 bgcolor=#d6d6d6
| 110227 ||  || — || September 19, 2001 || Socorro || LINEAR || — || align=right | 3.6 km || 
|-id=228 bgcolor=#E9E9E9
| 110228 ||  || — || September 19, 2001 || Socorro || LINEAR || HEN || align=right | 1.8 km || 
|-id=229 bgcolor=#d6d6d6
| 110229 ||  || — || September 19, 2001 || Socorro || LINEAR || — || align=right | 4.4 km || 
|-id=230 bgcolor=#E9E9E9
| 110230 ||  || — || September 19, 2001 || Socorro || LINEAR || — || align=right | 2.2 km || 
|-id=231 bgcolor=#E9E9E9
| 110231 ||  || — || September 19, 2001 || Socorro || LINEAR || — || align=right | 2.8 km || 
|-id=232 bgcolor=#d6d6d6
| 110232 ||  || — || September 19, 2001 || Socorro || LINEAR || — || align=right | 8.1 km || 
|-id=233 bgcolor=#d6d6d6
| 110233 ||  || — || September 19, 2001 || Socorro || LINEAR || — || align=right | 4.8 km || 
|-id=234 bgcolor=#d6d6d6
| 110234 ||  || — || September 19, 2001 || Socorro || LINEAR || — || align=right | 5.9 km || 
|-id=235 bgcolor=#d6d6d6
| 110235 ||  || — || September 19, 2001 || Socorro || LINEAR || EOS || align=right | 3.9 km || 
|-id=236 bgcolor=#d6d6d6
| 110236 ||  || — || September 19, 2001 || Socorro || LINEAR || — || align=right | 5.0 km || 
|-id=237 bgcolor=#E9E9E9
| 110237 ||  || — || September 19, 2001 || Socorro || LINEAR || — || align=right | 2.2 km || 
|-id=238 bgcolor=#E9E9E9
| 110238 ||  || — || September 19, 2001 || Socorro || LINEAR || — || align=right | 2.0 km || 
|-id=239 bgcolor=#E9E9E9
| 110239 ||  || — || September 19, 2001 || Socorro || LINEAR || MRX || align=right | 1.5 km || 
|-id=240 bgcolor=#E9E9E9
| 110240 ||  || — || September 19, 2001 || Socorro || LINEAR || — || align=right | 2.5 km || 
|-id=241 bgcolor=#E9E9E9
| 110241 ||  || — || September 19, 2001 || Socorro || LINEAR || — || align=right | 2.7 km || 
|-id=242 bgcolor=#d6d6d6
| 110242 ||  || — || September 19, 2001 || Socorro || LINEAR || KOR || align=right | 2.4 km || 
|-id=243 bgcolor=#E9E9E9
| 110243 ||  || — || September 19, 2001 || Socorro || LINEAR || HEN || align=right | 2.5 km || 
|-id=244 bgcolor=#E9E9E9
| 110244 ||  || — || September 19, 2001 || Socorro || LINEAR || — || align=right | 3.9 km || 
|-id=245 bgcolor=#E9E9E9
| 110245 ||  || — || September 19, 2001 || Socorro || LINEAR || — || align=right | 1.6 km || 
|-id=246 bgcolor=#d6d6d6
| 110246 ||  || — || September 19, 2001 || Socorro || LINEAR || — || align=right | 3.9 km || 
|-id=247 bgcolor=#E9E9E9
| 110247 ||  || — || September 19, 2001 || Socorro || LINEAR || — || align=right | 1.8 km || 
|-id=248 bgcolor=#d6d6d6
| 110248 ||  || — || September 19, 2001 || Socorro || LINEAR || THM || align=right | 6.2 km || 
|-id=249 bgcolor=#E9E9E9
| 110249 ||  || — || September 19, 2001 || Socorro || LINEAR || — || align=right | 3.1 km || 
|-id=250 bgcolor=#E9E9E9
| 110250 ||  || — || September 19, 2001 || Socorro || LINEAR || — || align=right | 3.0 km || 
|-id=251 bgcolor=#d6d6d6
| 110251 ||  || — || September 19, 2001 || Socorro || LINEAR || HYG || align=right | 5.0 km || 
|-id=252 bgcolor=#E9E9E9
| 110252 ||  || — || September 19, 2001 || Socorro || LINEAR || — || align=right | 1.9 km || 
|-id=253 bgcolor=#E9E9E9
| 110253 ||  || — || September 19, 2001 || Socorro || LINEAR || — || align=right | 1.7 km || 
|-id=254 bgcolor=#d6d6d6
| 110254 ||  || — || September 19, 2001 || Socorro || LINEAR || VER || align=right | 4.2 km || 
|-id=255 bgcolor=#E9E9E9
| 110255 ||  || — || September 19, 2001 || Socorro || LINEAR || NEM || align=right | 4.3 km || 
|-id=256 bgcolor=#E9E9E9
| 110256 ||  || — || September 19, 2001 || Socorro || LINEAR || — || align=right | 1.6 km || 
|-id=257 bgcolor=#fefefe
| 110257 ||  || — || September 19, 2001 || Socorro || LINEAR || V || align=right | 1.6 km || 
|-id=258 bgcolor=#E9E9E9
| 110258 ||  || — || September 19, 2001 || Socorro || LINEAR || AST || align=right | 3.9 km || 
|-id=259 bgcolor=#E9E9E9
| 110259 ||  || — || September 19, 2001 || Socorro || LINEAR || — || align=right | 1.3 km || 
|-id=260 bgcolor=#E9E9E9
| 110260 ||  || — || September 19, 2001 || Socorro || LINEAR || XIZ || align=right | 2.7 km || 
|-id=261 bgcolor=#E9E9E9
| 110261 ||  || — || September 19, 2001 || Socorro || LINEAR || — || align=right | 1.5 km || 
|-id=262 bgcolor=#E9E9E9
| 110262 ||  || — || September 19, 2001 || Socorro || LINEAR || HNA || align=right | 6.3 km || 
|-id=263 bgcolor=#E9E9E9
| 110263 ||  || — || September 19, 2001 || Socorro || LINEAR || — || align=right | 3.2 km || 
|-id=264 bgcolor=#E9E9E9
| 110264 ||  || — || September 19, 2001 || Socorro || LINEAR || — || align=right | 2.1 km || 
|-id=265 bgcolor=#E9E9E9
| 110265 ||  || — || September 19, 2001 || Socorro || LINEAR || — || align=right | 4.8 km || 
|-id=266 bgcolor=#d6d6d6
| 110266 ||  || — || September 19, 2001 || Socorro || LINEAR || THM || align=right | 3.0 km || 
|-id=267 bgcolor=#E9E9E9
| 110267 ||  || — || September 19, 2001 || Socorro || LINEAR || — || align=right | 3.0 km || 
|-id=268 bgcolor=#d6d6d6
| 110268 ||  || — || September 19, 2001 || Socorro || LINEAR || — || align=right | 6.1 km || 
|-id=269 bgcolor=#E9E9E9
| 110269 ||  || — || September 19, 2001 || Socorro || LINEAR || GAL || align=right | 2.3 km || 
|-id=270 bgcolor=#E9E9E9
| 110270 ||  || — || September 19, 2001 || Socorro || LINEAR || WIT || align=right | 1.8 km || 
|-id=271 bgcolor=#d6d6d6
| 110271 ||  || — || September 19, 2001 || Socorro || LINEAR || — || align=right | 4.6 km || 
|-id=272 bgcolor=#E9E9E9
| 110272 ||  || — || September 19, 2001 || Socorro || LINEAR || — || align=right | 3.0 km || 
|-id=273 bgcolor=#E9E9E9
| 110273 ||  || — || September 19, 2001 || Socorro || LINEAR || GEF || align=right | 2.4 km || 
|-id=274 bgcolor=#E9E9E9
| 110274 ||  || — || September 19, 2001 || Socorro || LINEAR || NEM || align=right | 2.9 km || 
|-id=275 bgcolor=#E9E9E9
| 110275 ||  || — || September 19, 2001 || Socorro || LINEAR || — || align=right | 2.7 km || 
|-id=276 bgcolor=#E9E9E9
| 110276 ||  || — || September 19, 2001 || Socorro || LINEAR || — || align=right | 3.6 km || 
|-id=277 bgcolor=#E9E9E9
| 110277 ||  || — || September 19, 2001 || Socorro || LINEAR || HEN || align=right | 2.5 km || 
|-id=278 bgcolor=#E9E9E9
| 110278 ||  || — || September 19, 2001 || Socorro || LINEAR || — || align=right | 2.8 km || 
|-id=279 bgcolor=#E9E9E9
| 110279 ||  || — || September 19, 2001 || Socorro || LINEAR || — || align=right | 2.7 km || 
|-id=280 bgcolor=#E9E9E9
| 110280 ||  || — || September 19, 2001 || Socorro || LINEAR || — || align=right | 2.4 km || 
|-id=281 bgcolor=#E9E9E9
| 110281 ||  || — || September 19, 2001 || Socorro || LINEAR || — || align=right | 3.7 km || 
|-id=282 bgcolor=#E9E9E9
| 110282 ||  || — || September 19, 2001 || Socorro || LINEAR || — || align=right | 3.0 km || 
|-id=283 bgcolor=#E9E9E9
| 110283 ||  || — || September 19, 2001 || Socorro || LINEAR || — || align=right | 4.1 km || 
|-id=284 bgcolor=#E9E9E9
| 110284 ||  || — || September 20, 2001 || Socorro || LINEAR || — || align=right | 1.1 km || 
|-id=285 bgcolor=#E9E9E9
| 110285 ||  || — || September 20, 2001 || Socorro || LINEAR || — || align=right | 5.3 km || 
|-id=286 bgcolor=#E9E9E9
| 110286 ||  || — || September 20, 2001 || Socorro || LINEAR || — || align=right | 2.9 km || 
|-id=287 bgcolor=#d6d6d6
| 110287 ||  || — || September 20, 2001 || Socorro || LINEAR || — || align=right | 6.6 km || 
|-id=288 bgcolor=#fefefe
| 110288 Libai ||  ||  || September 23, 2001 || Desert Eagle || W. K. Y. Yeung || NYS || align=right | 1.8 km || 
|-id=289 bgcolor=#d6d6d6
| 110289 Dufu ||  ||  || September 23, 2001 || Desert Eagle || W. K. Y. Yeung || — || align=right | 8.1 km || 
|-id=290 bgcolor=#E9E9E9
| 110290 ||  || — || September 23, 2001 || Desert Eagle || W. K. Y. Yeung || — || align=right | 3.6 km || 
|-id=291 bgcolor=#d6d6d6
| 110291 ||  || — || September 25, 2001 || Desert Eagle || W. K. Y. Yeung || MRC || align=right | 6.2 km || 
|-id=292 bgcolor=#E9E9E9
| 110292 ||  || — || September 25, 2001 || Desert Eagle || W. K. Y. Yeung || — || align=right | 4.8 km || 
|-id=293 bgcolor=#E9E9E9
| 110293 Oia ||  ||  || September 25, 2001 || Desert Eagle || W. K. Y. Yeung || — || align=right | 2.4 km || 
|-id=294 bgcolor=#E9E9E9
| 110294 Victoriaharbour ||  ||  || September 25, 2001 || Desert Eagle || W. K. Y. Yeung || — || align=right | 3.1 km || 
|-id=295 bgcolor=#E9E9E9
| 110295 Elcalafate ||  ||  || September 25, 2001 || Desert Eagle || W. K. Y. Yeung || — || align=right | 3.8 km || 
|-id=296 bgcolor=#E9E9E9
| 110296 Luxor ||  ||  || September 25, 2001 || Desert Eagle || W. K. Y. Yeung || — || align=right | 4.2 km || 
|-id=297 bgcolor=#d6d6d6
| 110297 Yellowriver ||  ||  || September 25, 2001 || Desert Eagle || W. K. Y. Yeung || THM || align=right | 4.7 km || 
|-id=298 bgcolor=#fefefe
| 110298 Deceptionisland ||  ||  || September 25, 2001 || Desert Eagle || W. K. Y. Yeung || — || align=right | 1.1 km || 
|-id=299 bgcolor=#E9E9E9
| 110299 Iceland ||  ||  || September 25, 2001 || Desert Eagle || W. K. Y. Yeung || WIT || align=right | 2.0 km || 
|-id=300 bgcolor=#E9E9E9
| 110300 Abusimbel ||  ||  || September 25, 2001 || Desert Eagle || W. K. Y. Yeung || — || align=right | 4.5 km || 
|}

110301–110400 

|-bgcolor=#E9E9E9
| 110301 ||  || — || September 18, 2001 || Palomar || NEAT || — || align=right | 3.8 km || 
|-id=302 bgcolor=#E9E9E9
| 110302 ||  || — || September 26, 2001 || Fountain Hills || C. W. Juels, P. R. Holvorcem || — || align=right | 2.3 km || 
|-id=303 bgcolor=#E9E9E9
| 110303 ||  || — || September 16, 2001 || Palomar || NEAT || — || align=right | 3.1 km || 
|-id=304 bgcolor=#E9E9E9
| 110304 ||  || — || September 16, 2001 || Palomar || NEAT || GEF || align=right | 2.5 km || 
|-id=305 bgcolor=#d6d6d6
| 110305 ||  || — || September 21, 2001 || Socorro || LINEAR || — || align=right | 4.8 km || 
|-id=306 bgcolor=#fefefe
| 110306 ||  || — || September 26, 2001 || Anderson Mesa || LONEOS || H || align=right | 1.5 km || 
|-id=307 bgcolor=#d6d6d6
| 110307 ||  || — || September 19, 2001 || Kitt Peak || Spacewatch || KOR || align=right | 2.3 km || 
|-id=308 bgcolor=#d6d6d6
| 110308 ||  || — || September 21, 2001 || Palomar || NEAT || — || align=right | 5.3 km || 
|-id=309 bgcolor=#E9E9E9
| 110309 ||  || — || September 21, 2001 || Anderson Mesa || LONEOS || — || align=right | 5.2 km || 
|-id=310 bgcolor=#d6d6d6
| 110310 ||  || — || September 21, 2001 || Anderson Mesa || LONEOS || — || align=right | 7.2 km || 
|-id=311 bgcolor=#E9E9E9
| 110311 ||  || — || September 21, 2001 || Anderson Mesa || LONEOS || — || align=right | 3.6 km || 
|-id=312 bgcolor=#E9E9E9
| 110312 ||  || — || September 21, 2001 || Anderson Mesa || LONEOS || — || align=right | 4.9 km || 
|-id=313 bgcolor=#E9E9E9
| 110313 ||  || — || September 21, 2001 || Anderson Mesa || LONEOS || WIT || align=right | 2.2 km || 
|-id=314 bgcolor=#E9E9E9
| 110314 ||  || — || September 21, 2001 || Anderson Mesa || LONEOS || — || align=right | 3.7 km || 
|-id=315 bgcolor=#E9E9E9
| 110315 ||  || — || September 21, 2001 || Anderson Mesa || LONEOS || — || align=right | 3.1 km || 
|-id=316 bgcolor=#E9E9E9
| 110316 ||  || — || September 21, 2001 || Anderson Mesa || LONEOS || AGN || align=right | 2.9 km || 
|-id=317 bgcolor=#E9E9E9
| 110317 ||  || — || September 21, 2001 || Anderson Mesa || LONEOS || — || align=right | 3.5 km || 
|-id=318 bgcolor=#d6d6d6
| 110318 ||  || — || September 21, 2001 || Anderson Mesa || LONEOS || — || align=right | 5.7 km || 
|-id=319 bgcolor=#E9E9E9
| 110319 ||  || — || September 21, 2001 || Anderson Mesa || LONEOS || — || align=right | 1.5 km || 
|-id=320 bgcolor=#E9E9E9
| 110320 ||  || — || September 21, 2001 || Anderson Mesa || LONEOS || — || align=right | 2.3 km || 
|-id=321 bgcolor=#E9E9E9
| 110321 ||  || — || September 21, 2001 || Anderson Mesa || LONEOS || — || align=right | 2.0 km || 
|-id=322 bgcolor=#E9E9E9
| 110322 ||  || — || September 21, 2001 || Anderson Mesa || LONEOS || — || align=right | 3.3 km || 
|-id=323 bgcolor=#E9E9E9
| 110323 ||  || — || September 27, 2001 || Socorro || LINEAR || PAL || align=right | 6.7 km || 
|-id=324 bgcolor=#E9E9E9
| 110324 ||  || — || September 22, 2001 || Socorro || LINEAR || EUN || align=right | 4.2 km || 
|-id=325 bgcolor=#FA8072
| 110325 ||  || — || September 28, 2001 || Fountain Hills || C. W. Juels, P. R. Holvorcem || — || align=right | 3.5 km || 
|-id=326 bgcolor=#E9E9E9
| 110326 ||  || — || September 21, 2001 || Palomar || NEAT || — || align=right | 2.0 km || 
|-id=327 bgcolor=#E9E9E9
| 110327 ||  || — || September 22, 2001 || Palomar || NEAT || — || align=right | 3.4 km || 
|-id=328 bgcolor=#E9E9E9
| 110328 ||  || — || September 22, 2001 || Palomar || NEAT || — || align=right | 2.4 km || 
|-id=329 bgcolor=#d6d6d6
| 110329 ||  || — || September 22, 2001 || Palomar || NEAT || ALA || align=right | 9.3 km || 
|-id=330 bgcolor=#E9E9E9
| 110330 ||  || — || September 27, 2001 || Palomar || NEAT || — || align=right | 2.5 km || 
|-id=331 bgcolor=#E9E9E9
| 110331 ||  || — || September 23, 2001 || Goodricke-Pigott || R. A. Tucker || — || align=right | 3.7 km || 
|-id=332 bgcolor=#E9E9E9
| 110332 ||  || — || September 25, 2001 || Goodricke-Pigott || R. A. Tucker || — || align=right | 5.1 km || 
|-id=333 bgcolor=#E9E9E9
| 110333 ||  || — || September 25, 2001 || Goodricke-Pigott || R. A. Tucker || WAT || align=right | 4.8 km || 
|-id=334 bgcolor=#d6d6d6
| 110334 ||  || — || September 21, 2001 || Anderson Mesa || LONEOS || — || align=right | 3.8 km || 
|-id=335 bgcolor=#E9E9E9
| 110335 ||  || — || September 17, 2001 || Anderson Mesa || LONEOS || — || align=right | 5.5 km || 
|-id=336 bgcolor=#E9E9E9
| 110336 ||  || — || September 17, 2001 || Anderson Mesa || LONEOS || — || align=right | 3.4 km || 
|-id=337 bgcolor=#E9E9E9
| 110337 ||  || — || September 17, 2001 || Anderson Mesa || LONEOS || — || align=right | 7.0 km || 
|-id=338 bgcolor=#d6d6d6
| 110338 ||  || — || September 17, 2001 || Anderson Mesa || LONEOS || — || align=right | 7.7 km || 
|-id=339 bgcolor=#E9E9E9
| 110339 ||  || — || September 17, 2001 || Anderson Mesa || LONEOS || — || align=right | 3.9 km || 
|-id=340 bgcolor=#E9E9E9
| 110340 ||  || — || September 23, 2001 || Anderson Mesa || LONEOS || — || align=right | 2.5 km || 
|-id=341 bgcolor=#E9E9E9
| 110341 ||  || — || September 23, 2001 || Anderson Mesa || LONEOS || — || align=right | 2.1 km || 
|-id=342 bgcolor=#fefefe
| 110342 ||  || — || September 16, 2001 || Socorro || LINEAR || — || align=right | 2.3 km || 
|-id=343 bgcolor=#d6d6d6
| 110343 ||  || — || September 16, 2001 || Socorro || LINEAR || — || align=right | 5.1 km || 
|-id=344 bgcolor=#d6d6d6
| 110344 ||  || — || September 20, 2001 || Socorro || LINEAR || — || align=right | 5.7 km || 
|-id=345 bgcolor=#fefefe
| 110345 ||  || — || September 20, 2001 || Socorro || LINEAR || — || align=right | 1.5 km || 
|-id=346 bgcolor=#d6d6d6
| 110346 ||  || — || September 20, 2001 || Socorro || LINEAR || — || align=right | 4.3 km || 
|-id=347 bgcolor=#E9E9E9
| 110347 ||  || — || September 20, 2001 || Socorro || LINEAR || HEN || align=right | 1.7 km || 
|-id=348 bgcolor=#E9E9E9
| 110348 ||  || — || September 20, 2001 || Socorro || LINEAR || — || align=right | 2.5 km || 
|-id=349 bgcolor=#d6d6d6
| 110349 ||  || — || September 21, 2001 || Socorro || LINEAR || EOS || align=right | 5.2 km || 
|-id=350 bgcolor=#d6d6d6
| 110350 ||  || — || September 23, 2001 || Socorro || LINEAR || HYG || align=right | 5.5 km || 
|-id=351 bgcolor=#E9E9E9
| 110351 ||  || — || September 23, 2001 || Socorro || LINEAR || — || align=right | 2.2 km || 
|-id=352 bgcolor=#d6d6d6
| 110352 ||  || — || September 25, 2001 || Socorro || LINEAR || EOS || align=right | 4.5 km || 
|-id=353 bgcolor=#E9E9E9
| 110353 ||  || — || September 25, 2001 || Socorro || LINEAR || HNS || align=right | 2.4 km || 
|-id=354 bgcolor=#E9E9E9
| 110354 ||  || — || September 25, 2001 || Socorro || LINEAR || — || align=right | 4.1 km || 
|-id=355 bgcolor=#E9E9E9
| 110355 ||  || — || September 25, 2001 || Socorro || LINEAR || — || align=right | 3.7 km || 
|-id=356 bgcolor=#E9E9E9
| 110356 ||  || — || September 25, 2001 || Socorro || LINEAR || GER || align=right | 3.2 km || 
|-id=357 bgcolor=#d6d6d6
| 110357 ||  || — || September 25, 2001 || Anderson Mesa || LONEOS || ALA || align=right | 7.5 km || 
|-id=358 bgcolor=#d6d6d6
| 110358 ||  || — || September 25, 2001 || Palomar || NEAT || — || align=right | 8.2 km || 
|-id=359 bgcolor=#C2FFFF
| 110359 ||  || — || September 19, 2001 || Socorro || LINEAR || L5 || align=right | 14 km || 
|-id=360 bgcolor=#E9E9E9
| 110360 ||  || — || September 25, 2001 || Socorro || LINEAR || — || align=right | 2.8 km || 
|-id=361 bgcolor=#E9E9E9
| 110361 ||  || — || September 26, 2001 || Socorro || LINEAR || GER || align=right | 3.2 km || 
|-id=362 bgcolor=#d6d6d6
| 110362 ||  || — || September 16, 2001 || Palomar || NEAT || — || align=right | 4.4 km || 
|-id=363 bgcolor=#E9E9E9
| 110363 ||  || — || September 16, 2001 || Socorro || LINEAR || — || align=right | 4.1 km || 
|-id=364 bgcolor=#E9E9E9
| 110364 ||  || — || September 16, 2001 || Socorro || LINEAR || — || align=right | 4.9 km || 
|-id=365 bgcolor=#d6d6d6
| 110365 ||  || — || September 17, 2001 || Anderson Mesa || LONEOS || EOS || align=right | 3.9 km || 
|-id=366 bgcolor=#E9E9E9
| 110366 ||  || — || September 17, 2001 || Anderson Mesa || LONEOS || EUN || align=right | 2.2 km || 
|-id=367 bgcolor=#E9E9E9
| 110367 ||  || — || September 18, 2001 || Palomar || NEAT || MAR || align=right | 1.9 km || 
|-id=368 bgcolor=#E9E9E9
| 110368 ||  || — || September 18, 2001 || Anderson Mesa || LONEOS || EUN || align=right | 2.3 km || 
|-id=369 bgcolor=#E9E9E9
| 110369 ||  || — || September 18, 2001 || Palomar || NEAT || ADE || align=right | 6.1 km || 
|-id=370 bgcolor=#E9E9E9
| 110370 ||  || — || September 18, 2001 || Palomar || NEAT || — || align=right | 4.7 km || 
|-id=371 bgcolor=#E9E9E9
| 110371 ||  || — || September 19, 2001 || Anderson Mesa || LONEOS || EUN || align=right | 2.1 km || 
|-id=372 bgcolor=#fefefe
| 110372 ||  || — || September 19, 2001 || Anderson Mesa || LONEOS || — || align=right | 2.0 km || 
|-id=373 bgcolor=#E9E9E9
| 110373 ||  || — || September 19, 2001 || Socorro || LINEAR || — || align=right | 3.6 km || 
|-id=374 bgcolor=#d6d6d6
| 110374 ||  || — || September 19, 2001 || Kitt Peak || Spacewatch || — || align=right | 7.0 km || 
|-id=375 bgcolor=#fefefe
| 110375 ||  || — || September 20, 2001 || Socorro || LINEAR || NYS || align=right | 1.4 km || 
|-id=376 bgcolor=#E9E9E9
| 110376 ||  || — || September 21, 2001 || Anderson Mesa || LONEOS || EUN || align=right | 2.9 km || 
|-id=377 bgcolor=#fefefe
| 110377 ||  || — || September 21, 2001 || Palomar || NEAT || — || align=right | 1.5 km || 
|-id=378 bgcolor=#E9E9E9
| 110378 ||  || — || September 22, 2001 || Palomar || NEAT || — || align=right | 1.9 km || 
|-id=379 bgcolor=#E9E9E9
| 110379 ||  || — || September 22, 2001 || Palomar || NEAT || — || align=right | 2.8 km || 
|-id=380 bgcolor=#C2FFFF
| 110380 ||  || — || September 22, 2001 || Palomar || NEAT || L5 || align=right | 16 km || 
|-id=381 bgcolor=#E9E9E9
| 110381 ||  || — || September 23, 2001 || Anderson Mesa || LONEOS || EUN || align=right | 3.4 km || 
|-id=382 bgcolor=#E9E9E9
| 110382 ||  || — || September 26, 2001 || Socorro || LINEAR || — || align=right | 3.5 km || 
|-id=383 bgcolor=#E9E9E9
| 110383 ||  || — || September 23, 2001 || Anderson Mesa || LONEOS || MAR || align=right | 2.1 km || 
|-id=384 bgcolor=#E9E9E9
| 110384 ||  || — || October 11, 2001 || Farpoint || Farpoint Obs. || — || align=right | 5.7 km || 
|-id=385 bgcolor=#E9E9E9
| 110385 ||  || — || October 6, 2001 || Palomar || NEAT || GEF || align=right | 2.4 km || 
|-id=386 bgcolor=#E9E9E9
| 110386 ||  || — || October 7, 2001 || Palomar || NEAT || VIB || align=right | 3.5 km || 
|-id=387 bgcolor=#E9E9E9
| 110387 ||  || — || October 7, 2001 || Palomar || NEAT || — || align=right | 2.8 km || 
|-id=388 bgcolor=#E9E9E9
| 110388 ||  || — || October 7, 2001 || Palomar || NEAT || HEN || align=right | 1.9 km || 
|-id=389 bgcolor=#E9E9E9
| 110389 ||  || — || October 10, 2001 || Palomar || NEAT || NEM || align=right | 3.4 km || 
|-id=390 bgcolor=#d6d6d6
| 110390 ||  || — || October 10, 2001 || Palomar || NEAT || — || align=right | 5.0 km || 
|-id=391 bgcolor=#d6d6d6
| 110391 ||  || — || October 11, 2001 || Desert Eagle || W. K. Y. Yeung || ALA || align=right | 8.7 km || 
|-id=392 bgcolor=#E9E9E9
| 110392 ||  || — || October 11, 2001 || Desert Eagle || W. K. Y. Yeung || MIS || align=right | 4.2 km || 
|-id=393 bgcolor=#E9E9E9
| 110393 Rammstein ||  ||  || October 11, 2001 || Le Creusot || J.-C. Merlin || — || align=right | 5.4 km || 
|-id=394 bgcolor=#d6d6d6
| 110394 ||  || — || October 9, 2001 || Socorro || LINEAR || — || align=right | 7.8 km || 
|-id=395 bgcolor=#E9E9E9
| 110395 ||  || — || October 9, 2001 || Socorro || LINEAR || EUN || align=right | 2.9 km || 
|-id=396 bgcolor=#E9E9E9
| 110396 ||  || — || October 11, 2001 || Socorro || LINEAR || — || align=right | 2.3 km || 
|-id=397 bgcolor=#E9E9E9
| 110397 ||  || — || October 13, 2001 || Socorro || LINEAR || — || align=right | 4.5 km || 
|-id=398 bgcolor=#E9E9E9
| 110398 ||  || — || October 13, 2001 || Socorro || LINEAR || HEN || align=right | 4.2 km || 
|-id=399 bgcolor=#E9E9E9
| 110399 ||  || — || October 13, 2001 || Socorro || LINEAR || — || align=right | 2.9 km || 
|-id=400 bgcolor=#fefefe
| 110400 ||  || — || October 13, 2001 || Socorro || LINEAR || — || align=right | 2.1 km || 
|}

110401–110500 

|-bgcolor=#E9E9E9
| 110401 ||  || — || October 13, 2001 || Socorro || LINEAR || NEM || align=right | 4.0 km || 
|-id=402 bgcolor=#E9E9E9
| 110402 ||  || — || October 13, 2001 || Socorro || LINEAR || — || align=right | 2.1 km || 
|-id=403 bgcolor=#fefefe
| 110403 ||  || — || October 11, 2001 || Socorro || LINEAR || PHO || align=right | 2.6 km || 
|-id=404 bgcolor=#E9E9E9
| 110404 Itoemi ||  ||  || October 11, 2001 || Goodricke-Pigott || R. A. Tucker || — || align=right | 6.4 km || 
|-id=405 bgcolor=#E9E9E9
| 110405 Itoyumi ||  ||  || October 12, 2001 || Goodricke-Pigott || R. A. Tucker || INO || align=right | 2.2 km || 
|-id=406 bgcolor=#E9E9E9
| 110406 ||  || — || October 6, 2001 || Palomar || NEAT || — || align=right | 2.9 km || 
|-id=407 bgcolor=#E9E9E9
| 110407 ||  || — || October 7, 2001 || Palomar || NEAT || — || align=right | 3.8 km || 
|-id=408 bgcolor=#E9E9E9
| 110408 Nakajima ||  ||  || October 13, 2001 || Goodricke-Pigott || R. A. Tucker || — || align=right | 2.9 km || 
|-id=409 bgcolor=#E9E9E9
| 110409 ||  || — || October 11, 2001 || Socorro || LINEAR || GEF || align=right | 2.8 km || 
|-id=410 bgcolor=#E9E9E9
| 110410 ||  || — || October 11, 2001 || Socorro || LINEAR || — || align=right | 3.2 km || 
|-id=411 bgcolor=#E9E9E9
| 110411 ||  || — || October 11, 2001 || Socorro || LINEAR || MAR || align=right | 2.6 km || 
|-id=412 bgcolor=#E9E9E9
| 110412 ||  || — || October 11, 2001 || Socorro || LINEAR || EUN || align=right | 2.7 km || 
|-id=413 bgcolor=#E9E9E9
| 110413 ||  || — || October 11, 2001 || Socorro || LINEAR || — || align=right | 3.1 km || 
|-id=414 bgcolor=#d6d6d6
| 110414 ||  || — || October 11, 2001 || Socorro || LINEAR || TIR || align=right | 6.0 km || 
|-id=415 bgcolor=#E9E9E9
| 110415 ||  || — || October 14, 2001 || Desert Eagle || W. K. Y. Yeung || — || align=right | 5.7 km || 
|-id=416 bgcolor=#d6d6d6
| 110416 Cardille ||  ||  || October 11, 2001 || Goodricke-Pigott || R. A. Tucker || — || align=right | 6.9 km || 
|-id=417 bgcolor=#E9E9E9
| 110417 ||  || — || October 9, 2001 || Socorro || LINEAR || — || align=right | 3.5 km || 
|-id=418 bgcolor=#E9E9E9
| 110418 ||  || — || October 9, 2001 || Socorro || LINEAR || — || align=right | 4.2 km || 
|-id=419 bgcolor=#E9E9E9
| 110419 ||  || — || October 9, 2001 || Socorro || LINEAR || GEF || align=right | 2.7 km || 
|-id=420 bgcolor=#E9E9E9
| 110420 ||  || — || October 9, 2001 || Socorro || LINEAR || — || align=right | 4.7 km || 
|-id=421 bgcolor=#E9E9E9
| 110421 ||  || — || October 9, 2001 || Socorro || LINEAR || — || align=right | 3.3 km || 
|-id=422 bgcolor=#E9E9E9
| 110422 ||  || — || October 9, 2001 || Socorro || LINEAR || EUN || align=right | 3.9 km || 
|-id=423 bgcolor=#E9E9E9
| 110423 ||  || — || October 9, 2001 || Socorro || LINEAR || — || align=right | 4.9 km || 
|-id=424 bgcolor=#fefefe
| 110424 ||  || — || October 11, 2001 || Socorro || LINEAR || — || align=right | 1.6 km || 
|-id=425 bgcolor=#E9E9E9
| 110425 ||  || — || October 14, 2001 || Socorro || LINEAR || — || align=right | 2.8 km || 
|-id=426 bgcolor=#E9E9E9
| 110426 ||  || — || October 14, 2001 || Socorro || LINEAR || HOF || align=right | 4.5 km || 
|-id=427 bgcolor=#E9E9E9
| 110427 ||  || — || October 14, 2001 || Socorro || LINEAR || NEM || align=right | 5.1 km || 
|-id=428 bgcolor=#E9E9E9
| 110428 ||  || — || October 14, 2001 || Socorro || LINEAR || — || align=right | 2.6 km || 
|-id=429 bgcolor=#E9E9E9
| 110429 ||  || — || October 14, 2001 || Socorro || LINEAR || — || align=right | 4.5 km || 
|-id=430 bgcolor=#E9E9E9
| 110430 ||  || — || October 14, 2001 || Socorro || LINEAR || WIT || align=right | 2.7 km || 
|-id=431 bgcolor=#E9E9E9
| 110431 ||  || — || October 14, 2001 || Socorro || LINEAR || HOF || align=right | 5.9 km || 
|-id=432 bgcolor=#d6d6d6
| 110432 ||  || — || October 14, 2001 || Socorro || LINEAR || — || align=right | 4.0 km || 
|-id=433 bgcolor=#E9E9E9
| 110433 ||  || — || October 14, 2001 || Socorro || LINEAR || — || align=right | 2.8 km || 
|-id=434 bgcolor=#E9E9E9
| 110434 ||  || — || October 14, 2001 || Socorro || LINEAR || — || align=right | 2.1 km || 
|-id=435 bgcolor=#E9E9E9
| 110435 ||  || — || October 14, 2001 || Socorro || LINEAR || — || align=right | 3.4 km || 
|-id=436 bgcolor=#E9E9E9
| 110436 ||  || — || October 14, 2001 || Socorro || LINEAR || — || align=right | 3.1 km || 
|-id=437 bgcolor=#E9E9E9
| 110437 ||  || — || October 14, 2001 || Socorro || LINEAR || MAR || align=right | 2.2 km || 
|-id=438 bgcolor=#E9E9E9
| 110438 ||  || — || October 14, 2001 || Socorro || LINEAR || — || align=right | 3.6 km || 
|-id=439 bgcolor=#E9E9E9
| 110439 ||  || — || October 14, 2001 || Socorro || LINEAR || — || align=right | 2.4 km || 
|-id=440 bgcolor=#d6d6d6
| 110440 ||  || — || October 14, 2001 || Socorro || LINEAR || — || align=right | 5.6 km || 
|-id=441 bgcolor=#E9E9E9
| 110441 ||  || — || October 14, 2001 || Socorro || LINEAR || — || align=right | 6.1 km || 
|-id=442 bgcolor=#E9E9E9
| 110442 ||  || — || October 14, 2001 || Socorro || LINEAR || — || align=right | 3.2 km || 
|-id=443 bgcolor=#E9E9E9
| 110443 ||  || — || October 14, 2001 || Socorro || LINEAR || RAF || align=right | 2.0 km || 
|-id=444 bgcolor=#E9E9E9
| 110444 ||  || — || October 14, 2001 || Socorro || LINEAR || — || align=right | 2.9 km || 
|-id=445 bgcolor=#E9E9E9
| 110445 ||  || — || October 14, 2001 || Socorro || LINEAR || — || align=right | 2.6 km || 
|-id=446 bgcolor=#E9E9E9
| 110446 ||  || — || October 14, 2001 || Socorro || LINEAR || ADE || align=right | 6.2 km || 
|-id=447 bgcolor=#E9E9E9
| 110447 ||  || — || October 14, 2001 || Socorro || LINEAR || RAF || align=right | 2.5 km || 
|-id=448 bgcolor=#d6d6d6
| 110448 ||  || — || October 14, 2001 || Socorro || LINEAR || — || align=right | 3.7 km || 
|-id=449 bgcolor=#E9E9E9
| 110449 ||  || — || October 14, 2001 || Socorro || LINEAR || CLO || align=right | 3.2 km || 
|-id=450 bgcolor=#E9E9E9
| 110450 ||  || — || October 14, 2001 || Socorro || LINEAR || — || align=right | 2.9 km || 
|-id=451 bgcolor=#E9E9E9
| 110451 ||  || — || October 14, 2001 || Socorro || LINEAR || — || align=right | 4.1 km || 
|-id=452 bgcolor=#E9E9E9
| 110452 ||  || — || October 14, 2001 || Socorro || LINEAR || — || align=right | 5.3 km || 
|-id=453 bgcolor=#E9E9E9
| 110453 ||  || — || October 14, 2001 || Socorro || LINEAR || — || align=right | 4.0 km || 
|-id=454 bgcolor=#E9E9E9
| 110454 ||  || — || October 14, 2001 || Socorro || LINEAR || — || align=right | 6.0 km || 
|-id=455 bgcolor=#E9E9E9
| 110455 ||  || — || October 14, 2001 || Socorro || LINEAR || DOR || align=right | 4.5 km || 
|-id=456 bgcolor=#E9E9E9
| 110456 ||  || — || October 14, 2001 || Socorro || LINEAR || INO || align=right | 2.9 km || 
|-id=457 bgcolor=#fefefe
| 110457 ||  || — || October 13, 2001 || Socorro || LINEAR || — || align=right | 1.8 km || 
|-id=458 bgcolor=#E9E9E9
| 110458 ||  || — || October 15, 2001 || Socorro || LINEAR || — || align=right | 3.0 km || 
|-id=459 bgcolor=#E9E9E9
| 110459 ||  || — || October 15, 2001 || Desert Eagle || W. K. Y. Yeung || — || align=right | 4.8 km || 
|-id=460 bgcolor=#E9E9E9
| 110460 ||  || — || October 15, 2001 || Desert Eagle || W. K. Y. Yeung || — || align=right | 3.3 km || 
|-id=461 bgcolor=#E9E9E9
| 110461 ||  || — || October 15, 2001 || Desert Eagle || W. K. Y. Yeung || — || align=right | 1.9 km || 
|-id=462 bgcolor=#d6d6d6
| 110462 ||  || — || October 14, 2001 || Desert Eagle || W. K. Y. Yeung || KOR || align=right | 3.6 km || 
|-id=463 bgcolor=#E9E9E9
| 110463 ||  || — || October 13, 2001 || Socorro || LINEAR || — || align=right | 2.1 km || 
|-id=464 bgcolor=#E9E9E9
| 110464 ||  || — || October 13, 2001 || Socorro || LINEAR || — || align=right | 3.3 km || 
|-id=465 bgcolor=#d6d6d6
| 110465 ||  || — || October 13, 2001 || Socorro || LINEAR || HYG || align=right | 7.4 km || 
|-id=466 bgcolor=#E9E9E9
| 110466 ||  || — || October 13, 2001 || Socorro || LINEAR || — || align=right | 2.0 km || 
|-id=467 bgcolor=#E9E9E9
| 110467 ||  || — || October 13, 2001 || Socorro || LINEAR || — || align=right | 1.4 km || 
|-id=468 bgcolor=#E9E9E9
| 110468 ||  || — || October 13, 2001 || Socorro || LINEAR || HEN || align=right | 1.7 km || 
|-id=469 bgcolor=#E9E9E9
| 110469 ||  || — || October 14, 2001 || Socorro || LINEAR || HNS || align=right | 2.6 km || 
|-id=470 bgcolor=#E9E9E9
| 110470 ||  || — || October 14, 2001 || Socorro || LINEAR || — || align=right | 2.4 km || 
|-id=471 bgcolor=#E9E9E9
| 110471 ||  || — || October 14, 2001 || Socorro || LINEAR || MRX || align=right | 2.7 km || 
|-id=472 bgcolor=#E9E9E9
| 110472 ||  || — || October 14, 2001 || Socorro || LINEAR || PAD || align=right | 4.0 km || 
|-id=473 bgcolor=#E9E9E9
| 110473 ||  || — || October 15, 2001 || Socorro || LINEAR || HEN || align=right | 2.4 km || 
|-id=474 bgcolor=#E9E9E9
| 110474 ||  || — || October 15, 2001 || Socorro || LINEAR || — || align=right | 5.4 km || 
|-id=475 bgcolor=#d6d6d6
| 110475 ||  || — || October 15, 2001 || Socorro || LINEAR || — || align=right | 4.3 km || 
|-id=476 bgcolor=#d6d6d6
| 110476 ||  || — || October 15, 2001 || Socorro || LINEAR || SYL7:4 || align=right | 6.3 km || 
|-id=477 bgcolor=#E9E9E9
| 110477 ||  || — || October 15, 2001 || Socorro || LINEAR || — || align=right | 2.9 km || 
|-id=478 bgcolor=#fefefe
| 110478 ||  || — || October 13, 2001 || Socorro || LINEAR || NYS || align=right | 2.2 km || 
|-id=479 bgcolor=#E9E9E9
| 110479 ||  || — || October 13, 2001 || Socorro || LINEAR || PAD || align=right | 5.0 km || 
|-id=480 bgcolor=#E9E9E9
| 110480 ||  || — || October 13, 2001 || Socorro || LINEAR || — || align=right | 4.8 km || 
|-id=481 bgcolor=#E9E9E9
| 110481 ||  || — || October 13, 2001 || Socorro || LINEAR || — || align=right | 3.2 km || 
|-id=482 bgcolor=#E9E9E9
| 110482 ||  || — || October 13, 2001 || Socorro || LINEAR || — || align=right | 3.5 km || 
|-id=483 bgcolor=#E9E9E9
| 110483 ||  || — || October 13, 2001 || Socorro || LINEAR || — || align=right | 2.4 km || 
|-id=484 bgcolor=#E9E9E9
| 110484 ||  || — || October 13, 2001 || Socorro || LINEAR || — || align=right | 2.6 km || 
|-id=485 bgcolor=#E9E9E9
| 110485 ||  || — || October 13, 2001 || Socorro || LINEAR || — || align=right | 3.9 km || 
|-id=486 bgcolor=#E9E9E9
| 110486 ||  || — || October 13, 2001 || Socorro || LINEAR || — || align=right | 2.4 km || 
|-id=487 bgcolor=#E9E9E9
| 110487 ||  || — || October 13, 2001 || Socorro || LINEAR || — || align=right | 2.3 km || 
|-id=488 bgcolor=#E9E9E9
| 110488 ||  || — || October 13, 2001 || Socorro || LINEAR || — || align=right | 3.6 km || 
|-id=489 bgcolor=#E9E9E9
| 110489 ||  || — || October 13, 2001 || Socorro || LINEAR || GEF || align=right | 3.1 km || 
|-id=490 bgcolor=#fefefe
| 110490 ||  || — || October 13, 2001 || Socorro || LINEAR || — || align=right | 1.6 km || 
|-id=491 bgcolor=#E9E9E9
| 110491 ||  || — || October 13, 2001 || Socorro || LINEAR || — || align=right | 4.1 km || 
|-id=492 bgcolor=#E9E9E9
| 110492 ||  || — || October 13, 2001 || Socorro || LINEAR || — || align=right | 5.3 km || 
|-id=493 bgcolor=#E9E9E9
| 110493 ||  || — || October 13, 2001 || Socorro || LINEAR || — || align=right | 3.2 km || 
|-id=494 bgcolor=#E9E9E9
| 110494 ||  || — || October 13, 2001 || Socorro || LINEAR || EUN || align=right | 2.4 km || 
|-id=495 bgcolor=#E9E9E9
| 110495 ||  || — || October 13, 2001 || Socorro || LINEAR || MAR || align=right | 3.3 km || 
|-id=496 bgcolor=#E9E9E9
| 110496 ||  || — || October 13, 2001 || Socorro || LINEAR || — || align=right | 2.1 km || 
|-id=497 bgcolor=#E9E9E9
| 110497 ||  || — || October 13, 2001 || Socorro || LINEAR || — || align=right | 4.7 km || 
|-id=498 bgcolor=#E9E9E9
| 110498 ||  || — || October 13, 2001 || Socorro || LINEAR || — || align=right | 3.2 km || 
|-id=499 bgcolor=#E9E9E9
| 110499 ||  || — || October 13, 2001 || Socorro || LINEAR || — || align=right | 2.3 km || 
|-id=500 bgcolor=#E9E9E9
| 110500 ||  || — || October 13, 2001 || Socorro || LINEAR || — || align=right | 2.4 km || 
|}

110501–110600 

|-bgcolor=#E9E9E9
| 110501 ||  || — || October 13, 2001 || Socorro || LINEAR || HEN || align=right | 1.7 km || 
|-id=502 bgcolor=#E9E9E9
| 110502 ||  || — || October 13, 2001 || Socorro || LINEAR || — || align=right | 2.9 km || 
|-id=503 bgcolor=#E9E9E9
| 110503 ||  || — || October 13, 2001 || Socorro || LINEAR || XIZ || align=right | 2.5 km || 
|-id=504 bgcolor=#E9E9E9
| 110504 ||  || — || October 13, 2001 || Socorro || LINEAR || — || align=right | 2.6 km || 
|-id=505 bgcolor=#d6d6d6
| 110505 ||  || — || October 13, 2001 || Socorro || LINEAR || HYG || align=right | 6.2 km || 
|-id=506 bgcolor=#E9E9E9
| 110506 ||  || — || October 13, 2001 || Socorro || LINEAR || — || align=right | 3.6 km || 
|-id=507 bgcolor=#E9E9E9
| 110507 ||  || — || October 13, 2001 || Socorro || LINEAR || — || align=right | 3.4 km || 
|-id=508 bgcolor=#E9E9E9
| 110508 ||  || — || October 13, 2001 || Socorro || LINEAR || — || align=right | 4.9 km || 
|-id=509 bgcolor=#E9E9E9
| 110509 ||  || — || October 13, 2001 || Socorro || LINEAR || — || align=right | 5.2 km || 
|-id=510 bgcolor=#E9E9E9
| 110510 ||  || — || October 13, 2001 || Socorro || LINEAR || — || align=right | 3.4 km || 
|-id=511 bgcolor=#d6d6d6
| 110511 ||  || — || October 13, 2001 || Socorro || LINEAR || — || align=right | 7.1 km || 
|-id=512 bgcolor=#E9E9E9
| 110512 ||  || — || October 13, 2001 || Socorro || LINEAR || — || align=right | 2.7 km || 
|-id=513 bgcolor=#E9E9E9
| 110513 ||  || — || October 13, 2001 || Socorro || LINEAR || — || align=right | 2.2 km || 
|-id=514 bgcolor=#E9E9E9
| 110514 ||  || — || October 13, 2001 || Socorro || LINEAR || HOF || align=right | 6.2 km || 
|-id=515 bgcolor=#E9E9E9
| 110515 ||  || — || October 13, 2001 || Socorro || LINEAR || — || align=right | 3.2 km || 
|-id=516 bgcolor=#E9E9E9
| 110516 ||  || — || October 13, 2001 || Socorro || LINEAR || — || align=right | 2.3 km || 
|-id=517 bgcolor=#E9E9E9
| 110517 ||  || — || October 13, 2001 || Socorro || LINEAR || MAR || align=right | 2.0 km || 
|-id=518 bgcolor=#d6d6d6
| 110518 ||  || — || October 13, 2001 || Socorro || LINEAR || LIX || align=right | 8.0 km || 
|-id=519 bgcolor=#E9E9E9
| 110519 ||  || — || October 13, 2001 || Socorro || LINEAR || — || align=right | 3.8 km || 
|-id=520 bgcolor=#E9E9E9
| 110520 ||  || — || October 13, 2001 || Socorro || LINEAR || — || align=right | 3.7 km || 
|-id=521 bgcolor=#E9E9E9
| 110521 ||  || — || October 13, 2001 || Socorro || LINEAR || — || align=right | 3.4 km || 
|-id=522 bgcolor=#E9E9E9
| 110522 ||  || — || October 13, 2001 || Socorro || LINEAR || — || align=right | 2.3 km || 
|-id=523 bgcolor=#E9E9E9
| 110523 ||  || — || October 14, 2001 || Socorro || LINEAR || — || align=right | 3.2 km || 
|-id=524 bgcolor=#E9E9E9
| 110524 ||  || — || October 14, 2001 || Socorro || LINEAR || — || align=right | 5.9 km || 
|-id=525 bgcolor=#E9E9E9
| 110525 ||  || — || October 14, 2001 || Socorro || LINEAR || JUN || align=right | 2.0 km || 
|-id=526 bgcolor=#E9E9E9
| 110526 ||  || — || October 14, 2001 || Socorro || LINEAR || — || align=right | 2.5 km || 
|-id=527 bgcolor=#E9E9E9
| 110527 ||  || — || October 14, 2001 || Socorro || LINEAR || — || align=right | 1.9 km || 
|-id=528 bgcolor=#d6d6d6
| 110528 ||  || — || October 14, 2001 || Socorro || LINEAR || — || align=right | 6.7 km || 
|-id=529 bgcolor=#E9E9E9
| 110529 ||  || — || October 14, 2001 || Socorro || LINEAR || — || align=right | 2.9 km || 
|-id=530 bgcolor=#E9E9E9
| 110530 ||  || — || October 14, 2001 || Socorro || LINEAR || — || align=right | 3.7 km || 
|-id=531 bgcolor=#d6d6d6
| 110531 ||  || — || October 14, 2001 || Socorro || LINEAR || — || align=right | 4.1 km || 
|-id=532 bgcolor=#E9E9E9
| 110532 ||  || — || October 14, 2001 || Socorro || LINEAR || — || align=right | 2.7 km || 
|-id=533 bgcolor=#E9E9E9
| 110533 ||  || — || October 14, 2001 || Socorro || LINEAR || — || align=right | 5.0 km || 
|-id=534 bgcolor=#E9E9E9
| 110534 ||  || — || October 14, 2001 || Socorro || LINEAR || HOF || align=right | 5.4 km || 
|-id=535 bgcolor=#E9E9E9
| 110535 ||  || — || October 14, 2001 || Socorro || LINEAR || — || align=right | 2.9 km || 
|-id=536 bgcolor=#E9E9E9
| 110536 ||  || — || October 14, 2001 || Socorro || LINEAR || — || align=right | 3.2 km || 
|-id=537 bgcolor=#E9E9E9
| 110537 ||  || — || October 14, 2001 || Socorro || LINEAR || — || align=right | 2.7 km || 
|-id=538 bgcolor=#fefefe
| 110538 ||  || — || October 14, 2001 || Socorro || LINEAR || — || align=right | 5.3 km || 
|-id=539 bgcolor=#E9E9E9
| 110539 ||  || — || October 14, 2001 || Socorro || LINEAR || — || align=right | 1.9 km || 
|-id=540 bgcolor=#E9E9E9
| 110540 ||  || — || October 14, 2001 || Socorro || LINEAR || — || align=right | 2.2 km || 
|-id=541 bgcolor=#E9E9E9
| 110541 ||  || — || October 14, 2001 || Socorro || LINEAR || — || align=right | 2.1 km || 
|-id=542 bgcolor=#E9E9E9
| 110542 ||  || — || October 14, 2001 || Socorro || LINEAR || — || align=right | 3.5 km || 
|-id=543 bgcolor=#d6d6d6
| 110543 ||  || — || October 14, 2001 || Socorro || LINEAR || — || align=right | 6.4 km || 
|-id=544 bgcolor=#E9E9E9
| 110544 ||  || — || October 14, 2001 || Socorro || LINEAR || — || align=right | 3.0 km || 
|-id=545 bgcolor=#fefefe
| 110545 ||  || — || October 14, 2001 || Socorro || LINEAR || — || align=right | 2.0 km || 
|-id=546 bgcolor=#E9E9E9
| 110546 ||  || — || October 14, 2001 || Socorro || LINEAR || AGN || align=right | 2.4 km || 
|-id=547 bgcolor=#E9E9E9
| 110547 ||  || — || October 14, 2001 || Socorro || LINEAR || EUN || align=right | 2.6 km || 
|-id=548 bgcolor=#E9E9E9
| 110548 ||  || — || October 14, 2001 || Socorro || LINEAR || — || align=right | 3.8 km || 
|-id=549 bgcolor=#d6d6d6
| 110549 ||  || — || October 14, 2001 || Socorro || LINEAR || SAN || align=right | 4.1 km || 
|-id=550 bgcolor=#E9E9E9
| 110550 ||  || — || October 15, 2001 || Socorro || LINEAR || MAR || align=right | 2.9 km || 
|-id=551 bgcolor=#E9E9E9
| 110551 ||  || — || October 15, 2001 || Socorro || LINEAR || — || align=right | 5.0 km || 
|-id=552 bgcolor=#E9E9E9
| 110552 ||  || — || October 15, 2001 || Socorro || LINEAR || ADE || align=right | 3.8 km || 
|-id=553 bgcolor=#E9E9E9
| 110553 ||  || — || October 14, 2001 || Desert Eagle || W. K. Y. Yeung || — || align=right | 3.0 km || 
|-id=554 bgcolor=#E9E9E9
| 110554 ||  || — || October 15, 2001 || Desert Eagle || W. K. Y. Yeung || — || align=right | 2.3 km || 
|-id=555 bgcolor=#E9E9E9
| 110555 ||  || — || October 13, 2001 || Socorro || LINEAR || — || align=right | 4.5 km || 
|-id=556 bgcolor=#E9E9E9
| 110556 ||  || — || October 13, 2001 || Socorro || LINEAR || — || align=right | 2.5 km || 
|-id=557 bgcolor=#E9E9E9
| 110557 ||  || — || October 13, 2001 || Socorro || LINEAR || — || align=right | 2.8 km || 
|-id=558 bgcolor=#E9E9E9
| 110558 ||  || — || October 13, 2001 || Socorro || LINEAR || — || align=right | 3.9 km || 
|-id=559 bgcolor=#E9E9E9
| 110559 ||  || — || October 13, 2001 || Socorro || LINEAR || — || align=right | 3.6 km || 
|-id=560 bgcolor=#E9E9E9
| 110560 ||  || — || October 13, 2001 || Socorro || LINEAR || EUN || align=right | 3.6 km || 
|-id=561 bgcolor=#E9E9E9
| 110561 ||  || — || October 13, 2001 || Socorro || LINEAR || — || align=right | 5.6 km || 
|-id=562 bgcolor=#E9E9E9
| 110562 ||  || — || October 14, 2001 || Socorro || LINEAR || DOR || align=right | 6.0 km || 
|-id=563 bgcolor=#C2FFFF
| 110563 ||  || — || October 14, 2001 || Socorro || LINEAR || L5 || align=right | 14 km || 
|-id=564 bgcolor=#E9E9E9
| 110564 ||  || — || October 14, 2001 || Socorro || LINEAR || — || align=right | 4.4 km || 
|-id=565 bgcolor=#E9E9E9
| 110565 ||  || — || October 14, 2001 || Socorro || LINEAR || — || align=right | 2.2 km || 
|-id=566 bgcolor=#E9E9E9
| 110566 ||  || — || October 14, 2001 || Socorro || LINEAR || — || align=right | 2.8 km || 
|-id=567 bgcolor=#E9E9E9
| 110567 ||  || — || October 14, 2001 || Socorro || LINEAR || MRX || align=right | 5.0 km || 
|-id=568 bgcolor=#E9E9E9
| 110568 ||  || — || October 14, 2001 || Socorro || LINEAR || — || align=right | 2.7 km || 
|-id=569 bgcolor=#E9E9E9
| 110569 ||  || — || October 14, 2001 || Socorro || LINEAR || — || align=right | 2.7 km || 
|-id=570 bgcolor=#E9E9E9
| 110570 ||  || — || October 14, 2001 || Socorro || LINEAR || — || align=right | 2.7 km || 
|-id=571 bgcolor=#E9E9E9
| 110571 ||  || — || October 14, 2001 || Socorro || LINEAR || — || align=right | 2.3 km || 
|-id=572 bgcolor=#E9E9E9
| 110572 ||  || — || October 14, 2001 || Socorro || LINEAR || — || align=right | 4.9 km || 
|-id=573 bgcolor=#E9E9E9
| 110573 ||  || — || October 14, 2001 || Socorro || LINEAR || — || align=right | 6.8 km || 
|-id=574 bgcolor=#d6d6d6
| 110574 ||  || — || October 14, 2001 || Socorro || LINEAR || EOS || align=right | 4.1 km || 
|-id=575 bgcolor=#E9E9E9
| 110575 ||  || — || October 14, 2001 || Socorro || LINEAR || MAR || align=right | 3.1 km || 
|-id=576 bgcolor=#E9E9E9
| 110576 ||  || — || October 14, 2001 || Socorro || LINEAR || — || align=right | 5.0 km || 
|-id=577 bgcolor=#fefefe
| 110577 ||  || — || October 14, 2001 || Socorro || LINEAR || H || align=right | 1.7 km || 
|-id=578 bgcolor=#E9E9E9
| 110578 ||  || — || October 14, 2001 || Socorro || LINEAR || EUN || align=right | 2.3 km || 
|-id=579 bgcolor=#E9E9E9
| 110579 ||  || — || October 15, 2001 || Socorro || LINEAR || EUN || align=right | 3.0 km || 
|-id=580 bgcolor=#E9E9E9
| 110580 ||  || — || October 15, 2001 || Socorro || LINEAR || — || align=right | 4.0 km || 
|-id=581 bgcolor=#E9E9E9
| 110581 ||  || — || October 15, 2001 || Socorro || LINEAR || — || align=right | 4.4 km || 
|-id=582 bgcolor=#E9E9E9
| 110582 ||  || — || October 15, 2001 || Socorro || LINEAR || — || align=right | 4.6 km || 
|-id=583 bgcolor=#E9E9E9
| 110583 ||  || — || October 15, 2001 || Socorro || LINEAR || — || align=right | 4.7 km || 
|-id=584 bgcolor=#E9E9E9
| 110584 ||  || — || October 15, 2001 || Socorro || LINEAR || EUN || align=right | 4.0 km || 
|-id=585 bgcolor=#d6d6d6
| 110585 ||  || — || October 15, 2001 || Socorro || LINEAR || — || align=right | 3.0 km || 
|-id=586 bgcolor=#E9E9E9
| 110586 ||  || — || October 15, 2001 || Socorro || LINEAR || slow || align=right | 2.6 km || 
|-id=587 bgcolor=#E9E9E9
| 110587 ||  || — || October 15, 2001 || Socorro || LINEAR || — || align=right | 2.9 km || 
|-id=588 bgcolor=#d6d6d6
| 110588 ||  || — || October 12, 2001 || Haleakala || NEAT || — || align=right | 8.2 km || 
|-id=589 bgcolor=#d6d6d6
| 110589 ||  || — || October 12, 2001 || Haleakala || NEAT || — || align=right | 5.1 km || 
|-id=590 bgcolor=#E9E9E9
| 110590 ||  || — || October 12, 2001 || Haleakala || NEAT || ADE || align=right | 5.2 km || 
|-id=591 bgcolor=#E9E9E9
| 110591 ||  || — || October 12, 2001 || Haleakala || NEAT || RAF || align=right | 2.3 km || 
|-id=592 bgcolor=#E9E9E9
| 110592 ||  || — || October 12, 2001 || Haleakala || NEAT || — || align=right | 3.4 km || 
|-id=593 bgcolor=#fefefe
| 110593 ||  || — || October 10, 2001 || Palomar || NEAT || — || align=right | 2.2 km || 
|-id=594 bgcolor=#d6d6d6
| 110594 ||  || — || October 13, 2001 || Palomar || NEAT || EOS || align=right | 5.1 km || 
|-id=595 bgcolor=#d6d6d6
| 110595 ||  || — || October 10, 2001 || Palomar || NEAT || VER || align=right | 6.5 km || 
|-id=596 bgcolor=#E9E9E9
| 110596 ||  || — || October 11, 2001 || Palomar || NEAT || — || align=right | 4.5 km || 
|-id=597 bgcolor=#E9E9E9
| 110597 ||  || — || October 11, 2001 || Palomar || NEAT || HEN || align=right | 1.6 km || 
|-id=598 bgcolor=#E9E9E9
| 110598 ||  || — || October 12, 2001 || Haleakala || NEAT || — || align=right | 2.7 km || 
|-id=599 bgcolor=#E9E9E9
| 110599 ||  || — || October 12, 2001 || Haleakala || NEAT || — || align=right | 5.0 km || 
|-id=600 bgcolor=#E9E9E9
| 110600 ||  || — || October 12, 2001 || Haleakala || NEAT || — || align=right | 6.3 km || 
|}

110601–110700 

|-bgcolor=#E9E9E9
| 110601 ||  || — || October 12, 2001 || Haleakala || NEAT || GEF || align=right | 2.4 km || 
|-id=602 bgcolor=#d6d6d6
| 110602 ||  || — || October 13, 2001 || Palomar || NEAT || — || align=right | 5.5 km || 
|-id=603 bgcolor=#E9E9E9
| 110603 ||  || — || October 13, 2001 || Palomar || NEAT || — || align=right | 3.7 km || 
|-id=604 bgcolor=#E9E9E9
| 110604 ||  || — || October 14, 2001 || Palomar || NEAT || — || align=right | 2.4 km || 
|-id=605 bgcolor=#d6d6d6
| 110605 ||  || — || October 14, 2001 || Palomar || NEAT || — || align=right | 7.6 km || 
|-id=606 bgcolor=#E9E9E9
| 110606 ||  || — || October 14, 2001 || Palomar || NEAT || ADE || align=right | 6.6 km || 
|-id=607 bgcolor=#d6d6d6
| 110607 ||  || — || October 14, 2001 || Palomar || NEAT || — || align=right | 7.1 km || 
|-id=608 bgcolor=#E9E9E9
| 110608 ||  || — || October 14, 2001 || Haleakala || NEAT || — || align=right | 3.3 km || 
|-id=609 bgcolor=#E9E9E9
| 110609 ||  || — || October 14, 2001 || Haleakala || NEAT || — || align=right | 2.0 km || 
|-id=610 bgcolor=#d6d6d6
| 110610 ||  || — || October 10, 2001 || Palomar || NEAT || — || align=right | 6.9 km || 
|-id=611 bgcolor=#E9E9E9
| 110611 ||  || — || October 10, 2001 || Palomar || NEAT || — || align=right | 2.4 km || 
|-id=612 bgcolor=#E9E9E9
| 110612 ||  || — || October 10, 2001 || Palomar || NEAT || — || align=right | 2.7 km || 
|-id=613 bgcolor=#E9E9E9
| 110613 ||  || — || October 10, 2001 || Palomar || NEAT || — || align=right | 3.6 km || 
|-id=614 bgcolor=#d6d6d6
| 110614 ||  || — || October 10, 2001 || Palomar || NEAT || — || align=right | 6.6 km || 
|-id=615 bgcolor=#E9E9E9
| 110615 ||  || — || October 10, 2001 || Palomar || NEAT || GEF || align=right | 3.1 km || 
|-id=616 bgcolor=#E9E9E9
| 110616 ||  || — || October 10, 2001 || Palomar || NEAT || — || align=right | 4.2 km || 
|-id=617 bgcolor=#E9E9E9
| 110617 ||  || — || October 10, 2001 || Palomar || NEAT || AGN || align=right | 1.7 km || 
|-id=618 bgcolor=#E9E9E9
| 110618 ||  || — || October 10, 2001 || Palomar || NEAT || — || align=right | 3.9 km || 
|-id=619 bgcolor=#E9E9E9
| 110619 ||  || — || October 10, 2001 || Palomar || NEAT || PAD || align=right | 3.8 km || 
|-id=620 bgcolor=#E9E9E9
| 110620 ||  || — || October 10, 2001 || Palomar || NEAT || — || align=right | 4.1 km || 
|-id=621 bgcolor=#E9E9E9
| 110621 ||  || — || October 10, 2001 || Palomar || NEAT || — || align=right | 4.7 km || 
|-id=622 bgcolor=#E9E9E9
| 110622 ||  || — || October 10, 2001 || Palomar || NEAT || — || align=right | 2.2 km || 
|-id=623 bgcolor=#E9E9E9
| 110623 ||  || — || October 14, 2001 || Haleakala || NEAT || PAD || align=right | 3.7 km || 
|-id=624 bgcolor=#E9E9E9
| 110624 ||  || — || October 15, 2001 || Palomar || NEAT || ADE || align=right | 4.2 km || 
|-id=625 bgcolor=#E9E9E9
| 110625 ||  || — || October 13, 2001 || Kitt Peak || Spacewatch || AST || align=right | 3.5 km || 
|-id=626 bgcolor=#E9E9E9
| 110626 ||  || — || October 11, 2001 || Palomar || NEAT || — || align=right | 2.3 km || 
|-id=627 bgcolor=#d6d6d6
| 110627 ||  || — || October 15, 2001 || Kitt Peak || Spacewatch || — || align=right | 5.0 km || 
|-id=628 bgcolor=#d6d6d6
| 110628 ||  || — || October 11, 2001 || Palomar || NEAT || THM || align=right | 4.8 km || 
|-id=629 bgcolor=#E9E9E9
| 110629 ||  || — || October 11, 2001 || Palomar || NEAT || — || align=right | 1.3 km || 
|-id=630 bgcolor=#E9E9E9
| 110630 ||  || — || October 15, 2001 || Palomar || NEAT || GEF || align=right | 3.5 km || 
|-id=631 bgcolor=#E9E9E9
| 110631 ||  || — || October 15, 2001 || Palomar || NEAT || RAF || align=right | 2.6 km || 
|-id=632 bgcolor=#E9E9E9
| 110632 ||  || — || October 14, 2001 || Socorro || LINEAR || — || align=right | 1.9 km || 
|-id=633 bgcolor=#E9E9E9
| 110633 ||  || — || October 14, 2001 || Socorro || LINEAR || — || align=right | 4.3 km || 
|-id=634 bgcolor=#E9E9E9
| 110634 ||  || — || October 14, 2001 || Socorro || LINEAR || ADE || align=right | 5.1 km || 
|-id=635 bgcolor=#E9E9E9
| 110635 ||  || — || October 15, 2001 || Socorro || LINEAR || — || align=right | 3.0 km || 
|-id=636 bgcolor=#E9E9E9
| 110636 ||  || — || October 15, 2001 || Socorro || LINEAR || — || align=right | 2.8 km || 
|-id=637 bgcolor=#E9E9E9
| 110637 ||  || — || October 15, 2001 || Socorro || LINEAR || — || align=right | 3.9 km || 
|-id=638 bgcolor=#E9E9E9
| 110638 ||  || — || October 15, 2001 || Socorro || LINEAR || — || align=right | 4.9 km || 
|-id=639 bgcolor=#E9E9E9
| 110639 ||  || — || October 15, 2001 || Socorro || LINEAR || — || align=right | 5.5 km || 
|-id=640 bgcolor=#E9E9E9
| 110640 ||  || — || October 15, 2001 || Socorro || LINEAR || ADE || align=right | 5.0 km || 
|-id=641 bgcolor=#E9E9E9
| 110641 ||  || — || October 15, 2001 || Socorro || LINEAR || — || align=right | 2.3 km || 
|-id=642 bgcolor=#E9E9E9
| 110642 ||  || — || October 15, 2001 || Socorro || LINEAR || — || align=right | 4.8 km || 
|-id=643 bgcolor=#d6d6d6
| 110643 ||  || — || October 15, 2001 || Socorro || LINEAR || — || align=right | 7.2 km || 
|-id=644 bgcolor=#E9E9E9
| 110644 ||  || — || October 15, 2001 || Socorro || LINEAR || GEF || align=right | 2.8 km || 
|-id=645 bgcolor=#d6d6d6
| 110645 ||  || — || October 15, 2001 || Socorro || LINEAR || — || align=right | 3.5 km || 
|-id=646 bgcolor=#E9E9E9
| 110646 ||  || — || October 15, 2001 || Socorro || LINEAR || — || align=right | 3.5 km || 
|-id=647 bgcolor=#E9E9E9
| 110647 ||  || — || October 15, 2001 || Socorro || LINEAR || — || align=right | 4.7 km || 
|-id=648 bgcolor=#E9E9E9
| 110648 ||  || — || October 15, 2001 || Socorro || LINEAR || — || align=right | 3.9 km || 
|-id=649 bgcolor=#E9E9E9
| 110649 ||  || — || October 15, 2001 || Socorro || LINEAR || — || align=right | 5.1 km || 
|-id=650 bgcolor=#E9E9E9
| 110650 ||  || — || October 15, 2001 || Kitt Peak || Spacewatch || — || align=right | 3.3 km || 
|-id=651 bgcolor=#E9E9E9
| 110651 ||  || — || October 13, 2001 || Palomar || NEAT || GEF || align=right | 2.9 km || 
|-id=652 bgcolor=#E9E9E9
| 110652 ||  || — || October 15, 2001 || Palomar || NEAT || ADE || align=right | 3.8 km || 
|-id=653 bgcolor=#E9E9E9
| 110653 ||  || — || October 14, 2001 || Anderson Mesa || LONEOS || JUN || align=right | 1.7 km || 
|-id=654 bgcolor=#E9E9E9
| 110654 ||  || — || October 13, 2001 || Socorro || LINEAR || — || align=right | 3.3 km || 
|-id=655 bgcolor=#E9E9E9
| 110655 ||  || — || October 13, 2001 || Socorro || LINEAR || — || align=right | 4.0 km || 
|-id=656 bgcolor=#E9E9E9
| 110656 ||  || — || October 13, 2001 || Socorro || LINEAR || — || align=right | 3.8 km || 
|-id=657 bgcolor=#E9E9E9
| 110657 ||  || — || October 14, 2001 || Socorro || LINEAR || — || align=right | 2.9 km || 
|-id=658 bgcolor=#E9E9E9
| 110658 ||  || — || October 14, 2001 || Socorro || LINEAR || — || align=right | 1.9 km || 
|-id=659 bgcolor=#d6d6d6
| 110659 ||  || — || October 14, 2001 || Socorro || LINEAR || HIL3:2 || align=right | 11 km || 
|-id=660 bgcolor=#E9E9E9
| 110660 ||  || — || October 14, 2001 || Socorro || LINEAR || — || align=right | 1.7 km || 
|-id=661 bgcolor=#E9E9E9
| 110661 ||  || — || October 14, 2001 || Socorro || LINEAR || — || align=right | 2.6 km || 
|-id=662 bgcolor=#E9E9E9
| 110662 ||  || — || October 14, 2001 || Socorro || LINEAR || — || align=right | 3.4 km || 
|-id=663 bgcolor=#d6d6d6
| 110663 ||  || — || October 14, 2001 || Socorro || LINEAR || — || align=right | 7.7 km || 
|-id=664 bgcolor=#E9E9E9
| 110664 ||  || — || October 14, 2001 || Socorro || LINEAR || PAD || align=right | 3.5 km || 
|-id=665 bgcolor=#E9E9E9
| 110665 ||  || — || October 14, 2001 || Socorro || LINEAR || ADE || align=right | 4.6 km || 
|-id=666 bgcolor=#E9E9E9
| 110666 ||  || — || October 14, 2001 || Socorro || LINEAR || NEM || align=right | 3.8 km || 
|-id=667 bgcolor=#E9E9E9
| 110667 ||  || — || October 14, 2001 || Socorro || LINEAR || — || align=right | 2.9 km || 
|-id=668 bgcolor=#E9E9E9
| 110668 ||  || — || October 14, 2001 || Socorro || LINEAR || — || align=right | 3.7 km || 
|-id=669 bgcolor=#E9E9E9
| 110669 ||  || — || October 15, 2001 || Socorro || LINEAR || — || align=right | 2.3 km || 
|-id=670 bgcolor=#E9E9E9
| 110670 ||  || — || October 15, 2001 || Socorro || LINEAR || — || align=right | 2.0 km || 
|-id=671 bgcolor=#E9E9E9
| 110671 ||  || — || October 15, 2001 || Socorro || LINEAR || — || align=right | 2.5 km || 
|-id=672 bgcolor=#d6d6d6
| 110672 ||  || — || October 15, 2001 || Palomar || NEAT || — || align=right | 5.5 km || 
|-id=673 bgcolor=#E9E9E9
| 110673 ||  || — || October 15, 2001 || Palomar || NEAT || — || align=right | 5.0 km || 
|-id=674 bgcolor=#E9E9E9
| 110674 ||  || — || October 15, 2001 || Palomar || NEAT || — || align=right | 5.0 km || 
|-id=675 bgcolor=#E9E9E9
| 110675 ||  || — || October 15, 2001 || Palomar || NEAT || JUN || align=right | 2.5 km || 
|-id=676 bgcolor=#E9E9E9
| 110676 ||  || — || October 12, 2001 || Haleakala || NEAT || MAR || align=right | 2.0 km || 
|-id=677 bgcolor=#E9E9E9
| 110677 ||  || — || October 14, 2001 || Haleakala || NEAT || — || align=right | 4.2 km || 
|-id=678 bgcolor=#d6d6d6
| 110678 ||  || — || October 15, 2001 || Palomar || NEAT || MEL || align=right | 6.2 km || 
|-id=679 bgcolor=#E9E9E9
| 110679 ||  || — || October 11, 2001 || Socorro || LINEAR || — || align=right | 3.0 km || 
|-id=680 bgcolor=#E9E9E9
| 110680 ||  || — || October 11, 2001 || Socorro || LINEAR || GEF || align=right | 2.4 km || 
|-id=681 bgcolor=#d6d6d6
| 110681 ||  || — || October 11, 2001 || Socorro || LINEAR || EUP || align=right | 9.6 km || 
|-id=682 bgcolor=#E9E9E9
| 110682 ||  || — || October 11, 2001 || Socorro || LINEAR || — || align=right | 4.7 km || 
|-id=683 bgcolor=#d6d6d6
| 110683 ||  || — || October 11, 2001 || Socorro || LINEAR || — || align=right | 3.7 km || 
|-id=684 bgcolor=#E9E9E9
| 110684 ||  || — || October 11, 2001 || Socorro || LINEAR || — || align=right | 2.0 km || 
|-id=685 bgcolor=#E9E9E9
| 110685 ||  || — || October 11, 2001 || Socorro || LINEAR || JUN || align=right | 6.3 km || 
|-id=686 bgcolor=#E9E9E9
| 110686 ||  || — || October 11, 2001 || Socorro || LINEAR || MAR || align=right | 1.7 km || 
|-id=687 bgcolor=#E9E9E9
| 110687 ||  || — || October 11, 2001 || Socorro || LINEAR || — || align=right | 2.8 km || 
|-id=688 bgcolor=#E9E9E9
| 110688 ||  || — || October 11, 2001 || Socorro || LINEAR || — || align=right | 3.9 km || 
|-id=689 bgcolor=#E9E9E9
| 110689 ||  || — || October 11, 2001 || Socorro || LINEAR || — || align=right | 2.8 km || 
|-id=690 bgcolor=#E9E9E9
| 110690 ||  || — || October 11, 2001 || Socorro || LINEAR || — || align=right | 2.0 km || 
|-id=691 bgcolor=#E9E9E9
| 110691 ||  || — || October 11, 2001 || Socorro || LINEAR || — || align=right | 3.1 km || 
|-id=692 bgcolor=#E9E9E9
| 110692 ||  || — || October 11, 2001 || Palomar || NEAT || — || align=right | 3.5 km || 
|-id=693 bgcolor=#E9E9E9
| 110693 ||  || — || October 12, 2001 || Haleakala || NEAT || GEF || align=right | 2.6 km || 
|-id=694 bgcolor=#E9E9E9
| 110694 ||  || — || October 13, 2001 || Palomar || NEAT || — || align=right | 5.3 km || 
|-id=695 bgcolor=#E9E9E9
| 110695 ||  || — || October 13, 2001 || Palomar || NEAT || — || align=right | 3.2 km || 
|-id=696 bgcolor=#E9E9E9
| 110696 ||  || — || October 13, 2001 || Anderson Mesa || LONEOS || RAF || align=right | 6.0 km || 
|-id=697 bgcolor=#E9E9E9
| 110697 ||  || — || October 13, 2001 || Palomar || NEAT || — || align=right | 4.1 km || 
|-id=698 bgcolor=#E9E9E9
| 110698 ||  || — || October 13, 2001 || Anderson Mesa || LONEOS || — || align=right | 3.3 km || 
|-id=699 bgcolor=#E9E9E9
| 110699 ||  || — || October 13, 2001 || Anderson Mesa || LONEOS || — || align=right | 3.7 km || 
|-id=700 bgcolor=#E9E9E9
| 110700 ||  || — || October 13, 2001 || Palomar || NEAT || AER || align=right | 2.2 km || 
|}

110701–110800 

|-bgcolor=#E9E9E9
| 110701 ||  || — || October 13, 2001 || Palomar || NEAT || EUN || align=right | 2.1 km || 
|-id=702 bgcolor=#E9E9E9
| 110702 Titostagno ||  ||  || October 13, 2001 || Campo Imperatore || CINEOS || — || align=right | 5.5 km || 
|-id=703 bgcolor=#E9E9E9
| 110703 ||  || — || October 13, 2001 || Anderson Mesa || LONEOS || — || align=right | 3.5 km || 
|-id=704 bgcolor=#fefefe
| 110704 ||  || — || October 14, 2001 || Anderson Mesa || LONEOS || FLO || align=right | 1.4 km || 
|-id=705 bgcolor=#E9E9E9
| 110705 ||  || — || October 14, 2001 || Anderson Mesa || LONEOS || — || align=right | 2.7 km || 
|-id=706 bgcolor=#E9E9E9
| 110706 ||  || — || October 14, 2001 || Socorro || LINEAR || — || align=right | 4.0 km || 
|-id=707 bgcolor=#E9E9E9
| 110707 ||  || — || October 14, 2001 || Socorro || LINEAR || — || align=right | 4.1 km || 
|-id=708 bgcolor=#E9E9E9
| 110708 ||  || — || October 14, 2001 || Anderson Mesa || LONEOS || GEF || align=right | 2.8 km || 
|-id=709 bgcolor=#E9E9E9
| 110709 ||  || — || October 14, 2001 || Palomar || NEAT || — || align=right | 3.1 km || 
|-id=710 bgcolor=#E9E9E9
| 110710 ||  || — || October 15, 2001 || Socorro || LINEAR || — || align=right | 2.0 km || 
|-id=711 bgcolor=#E9E9E9
| 110711 ||  || — || October 15, 2001 || Socorro || LINEAR || — || align=right | 3.2 km || 
|-id=712 bgcolor=#E9E9E9
| 110712 ||  || — || October 15, 2001 || Socorro || LINEAR || — || align=right | 3.8 km || 
|-id=713 bgcolor=#d6d6d6
| 110713 ||  || — || October 15, 2001 || Palomar || NEAT || EOS || align=right | 3.9 km || 
|-id=714 bgcolor=#E9E9E9
| 110714 ||  || — || October 15, 2001 || Socorro || LINEAR || — || align=right | 4.3 km || 
|-id=715 bgcolor=#d6d6d6
| 110715 ||  || — || October 15, 2001 || Palomar || NEAT || — || align=right | 8.3 km || 
|-id=716 bgcolor=#E9E9E9
| 110716 ||  || — || October 15, 2001 || Palomar || NEAT || — || align=right | 3.1 km || 
|-id=717 bgcolor=#d6d6d6
| 110717 ||  || — || October 15, 2001 || Palomar || NEAT || — || align=right | 6.5 km || 
|-id=718 bgcolor=#d6d6d6
| 110718 ||  || — || October 15, 2001 || Palomar || NEAT || — || align=right | 3.7 km || 
|-id=719 bgcolor=#d6d6d6
| 110719 ||  || — || October 15, 2001 || Palomar || NEAT || — || align=right | 7.7 km || 
|-id=720 bgcolor=#E9E9E9
| 110720 ||  || — || October 15, 2001 || Palomar || NEAT || — || align=right | 2.1 km || 
|-id=721 bgcolor=#d6d6d6
| 110721 ||  || — || October 15, 2001 || Palomar || NEAT || — || align=right | 8.4 km || 
|-id=722 bgcolor=#d6d6d6
| 110722 ||  || — || October 15, 2001 || Palomar || NEAT || EOS || align=right | 3.9 km || 
|-id=723 bgcolor=#E9E9E9
| 110723 ||  || — || October 15, 2001 || Palomar || NEAT || — || align=right | 3.1 km || 
|-id=724 bgcolor=#E9E9E9
| 110724 ||  || — || October 15, 2001 || Palomar || NEAT || — || align=right | 2.8 km || 
|-id=725 bgcolor=#E9E9E9
| 110725 ||  || — || October 15, 2001 || Palomar || NEAT || — || align=right | 2.4 km || 
|-id=726 bgcolor=#E9E9E9
| 110726 ||  || — || October 15, 2001 || Palomar || NEAT || — || align=right | 2.0 km || 
|-id=727 bgcolor=#d6d6d6
| 110727 ||  || — || October 15, 2001 || Palomar || NEAT || LIX || align=right | 8.6 km || 
|-id=728 bgcolor=#E9E9E9
| 110728 ||  || — || October 15, 2001 || Palomar || NEAT || — || align=right | 2.4 km || 
|-id=729 bgcolor=#E9E9E9
| 110729 ||  || — || October 15, 2001 || Haleakala || NEAT || — || align=right | 3.0 km || 
|-id=730 bgcolor=#E9E9E9
| 110730 ||  || — || October 7, 2001 || Palomar || NEAT || — || align=right | 2.8 km || 
|-id=731 bgcolor=#E9E9E9
| 110731 ||  || — || October 11, 2001 || Socorro || LINEAR || — || align=right | 2.1 km || 
|-id=732 bgcolor=#E9E9E9
| 110732 ||  || — || October 15, 2001 || Palomar || NEAT || EUN || align=right | 2.3 km || 
|-id=733 bgcolor=#d6d6d6
| 110733 ||  || — || October 15, 2001 || Palomar || NEAT || — || align=right | 3.9 km || 
|-id=734 bgcolor=#E9E9E9
| 110734 ||  || — || October 15, 2001 || Palomar || NEAT || — || align=right | 2.4 km || 
|-id=735 bgcolor=#d6d6d6
| 110735 ||  || — || October 15, 2001 || Palomar || NEAT || — || align=right | 7.3 km || 
|-id=736 bgcolor=#E9E9E9
| 110736 ||  || — || October 15, 2001 || Palomar || NEAT || — || align=right | 3.5 km || 
|-id=737 bgcolor=#E9E9E9
| 110737 ||  || — || October 14, 2001 || Socorro || LINEAR || — || align=right | 4.4 km || 
|-id=738 bgcolor=#d6d6d6
| 110738 ||  || — || October 13, 2001 || Anderson Mesa || LONEOS || — || align=right | 4.4 km || 
|-id=739 bgcolor=#E9E9E9
| 110739 ||  || — || October 14, 2001 || Anderson Mesa || LONEOS || — || align=right | 3.9 km || 
|-id=740 bgcolor=#d6d6d6
| 110740 || 2001 UF || — || October 17, 2001 || Nashville || R. Clingan || HYG || align=right | 3.4 km || 
|-id=741 bgcolor=#E9E9E9
| 110741 ||  || — || October 16, 2001 || Desert Eagle || W. K. Y. Yeung || — || align=right | 5.4 km || 
|-id=742 bgcolor=#d6d6d6
| 110742 Tetuokudo ||  ||  || October 18, 2001 || Kuma Kogen || A. Nakamura || — || align=right | 7.0 km || 
|-id=743 bgcolor=#E9E9E9
| 110743 Hirobumi ||  ||  || October 18, 2001 || Kuma Kogen || A. Nakamura || — || align=right | 3.4 km || 
|-id=744 bgcolor=#d6d6d6
| 110744 ||  || — || October 16, 2001 || Socorro || LINEAR || — || align=right | 4.9 km || 
|-id=745 bgcolor=#E9E9E9
| 110745 ||  || — || October 21, 2001 || Desert Eagle || W. K. Y. Yeung || — || align=right | 5.1 km || 
|-id=746 bgcolor=#E9E9E9
| 110746 ||  || — || October 17, 2001 || Socorro || LINEAR || EUN || align=right | 2.8 km || 
|-id=747 bgcolor=#E9E9E9
| 110747 ||  || — || October 17, 2001 || Socorro || LINEAR || — || align=right | 2.0 km || 
|-id=748 bgcolor=#E9E9E9
| 110748 ||  || — || October 17, 2001 || Socorro || LINEAR || — || align=right | 4.0 km || 
|-id=749 bgcolor=#E9E9E9
| 110749 ||  || — || October 17, 2001 || Socorro || LINEAR || — || align=right | 3.7 km || 
|-id=750 bgcolor=#E9E9E9
| 110750 ||  || — || October 17, 2001 || Socorro || LINEAR || — || align=right | 5.0 km || 
|-id=751 bgcolor=#E9E9E9
| 110751 ||  || — || October 24, 2001 || Desert Eagle || W. K. Y. Yeung || GEF || align=right | 2.7 km || 
|-id=752 bgcolor=#E9E9E9
| 110752 ||  || — || October 24, 2001 || Desert Eagle || W. K. Y. Yeung || — || align=right | 4.0 km || 
|-id=753 bgcolor=#E9E9E9
| 110753 ||  || — || October 24, 2001 || Desert Eagle || W. K. Y. Yeung || — || align=right | 2.8 km || 
|-id=754 bgcolor=#E9E9E9
| 110754 ||  || — || October 24, 2001 || Desert Eagle || W. K. Y. Yeung || — || align=right | 1.5 km || 
|-id=755 bgcolor=#E9E9E9
| 110755 ||  || — || October 24, 2001 || Desert Eagle || W. K. Y. Yeung || MAR || align=right | 2.5 km || 
|-id=756 bgcolor=#E9E9E9
| 110756 ||  || — || October 25, 2001 || Desert Eagle || W. K. Y. Yeung || — || align=right | 5.0 km || 
|-id=757 bgcolor=#fefefe
| 110757 ||  || — || October 25, 2001 || Desert Eagle || W. K. Y. Yeung || — || align=right | 1.3 km || 
|-id=758 bgcolor=#fefefe
| 110758 ||  || — || October 23, 2001 || Desert Eagle || W. K. Y. Yeung || H || align=right | 1.6 km || 
|-id=759 bgcolor=#E9E9E9
| 110759 ||  || — || October 16, 2001 || Palomar || NEAT || ADE || align=right | 4.4 km || 
|-id=760 bgcolor=#d6d6d6
| 110760 ||  || — || October 16, 2001 || Palomar || NEAT || EOS || align=right | 5.8 km || 
|-id=761 bgcolor=#fefefe
| 110761 ||  || — || October 16, 2001 || Palomar || NEAT || — || align=right | 2.2 km || 
|-id=762 bgcolor=#E9E9E9
| 110762 ||  || — || October 16, 2001 || Palomar || NEAT || — || align=right | 2.0 km || 
|-id=763 bgcolor=#E9E9E9
| 110763 ||  || — || October 17, 2001 || Socorro || LINEAR || — || align=right | 2.4 km || 
|-id=764 bgcolor=#E9E9E9
| 110764 ||  || — || October 18, 2001 || Socorro || LINEAR || EUN || align=right | 3.0 km || 
|-id=765 bgcolor=#E9E9E9
| 110765 ||  || — || October 18, 2001 || Socorro || LINEAR || — || align=right | 2.6 km || 
|-id=766 bgcolor=#d6d6d6
| 110766 ||  || — || October 18, 2001 || Socorro || LINEAR || — || align=right | 6.7 km || 
|-id=767 bgcolor=#E9E9E9
| 110767 ||  || — || October 18, 2001 || Socorro || LINEAR || EUN || align=right | 2.8 km || 
|-id=768 bgcolor=#E9E9E9
| 110768 ||  || — || October 18, 2001 || Socorro || LINEAR || — || align=right | 4.0 km || 
|-id=769 bgcolor=#E9E9E9
| 110769 ||  || — || October 18, 2001 || Socorro || LINEAR || — || align=right | 3.3 km || 
|-id=770 bgcolor=#E9E9E9
| 110770 ||  || — || October 16, 2001 || Haleakala || NEAT || MAR || align=right | 2.1 km || 
|-id=771 bgcolor=#E9E9E9
| 110771 ||  || — || October 23, 2001 || Socorro || LINEAR || BRU || align=right | 8.9 km || 
|-id=772 bgcolor=#E9E9E9
| 110772 ||  || — || October 16, 2001 || Socorro || LINEAR || — || align=right | 1.7 km || 
|-id=773 bgcolor=#E9E9E9
| 110773 ||  || — || October 16, 2001 || Socorro || LINEAR || — || align=right | 3.7 km || 
|-id=774 bgcolor=#E9E9E9
| 110774 ||  || — || October 16, 2001 || Socorro || LINEAR || — || align=right | 2.6 km || 
|-id=775 bgcolor=#E9E9E9
| 110775 ||  || — || October 16, 2001 || Socorro || LINEAR || — || align=right | 2.0 km || 
|-id=776 bgcolor=#d6d6d6
| 110776 ||  || — || October 16, 2001 || Socorro || LINEAR || — || align=right | 4.4 km || 
|-id=777 bgcolor=#d6d6d6
| 110777 ||  || — || October 16, 2001 || Socorro || LINEAR || — || align=right | 7.7 km || 
|-id=778 bgcolor=#d6d6d6
| 110778 ||  || — || October 16, 2001 || Socorro || LINEAR || — || align=right | 6.9 km || 
|-id=779 bgcolor=#E9E9E9
| 110779 ||  || — || October 16, 2001 || Socorro || LINEAR || ADE || align=right | 4.3 km || 
|-id=780 bgcolor=#d6d6d6
| 110780 ||  || — || October 16, 2001 || Socorro || LINEAR || — || align=right | 5.0 km || 
|-id=781 bgcolor=#E9E9E9
| 110781 ||  || — || October 16, 2001 || Socorro || LINEAR || — || align=right | 4.7 km || 
|-id=782 bgcolor=#E9E9E9
| 110782 ||  || — || October 16, 2001 || Socorro || LINEAR || — || align=right | 4.5 km || 
|-id=783 bgcolor=#E9E9E9
| 110783 ||  || — || October 16, 2001 || Socorro || LINEAR || WIT || align=right | 5.2 km || 
|-id=784 bgcolor=#E9E9E9
| 110784 ||  || — || October 16, 2001 || Socorro || LINEAR || — || align=right | 4.6 km || 
|-id=785 bgcolor=#E9E9E9
| 110785 ||  || — || October 16, 2001 || Socorro || LINEAR || — || align=right | 2.5 km || 
|-id=786 bgcolor=#E9E9E9
| 110786 ||  || — || October 16, 2001 || Socorro || LINEAR || — || align=right | 2.6 km || 
|-id=787 bgcolor=#E9E9E9
| 110787 ||  || — || October 16, 2001 || Socorro || LINEAR || — || align=right | 6.0 km || 
|-id=788 bgcolor=#E9E9E9
| 110788 ||  || — || October 16, 2001 || Socorro || LINEAR || — || align=right | 5.1 km || 
|-id=789 bgcolor=#E9E9E9
| 110789 ||  || — || October 16, 2001 || Socorro || LINEAR || ADE || align=right | 5.6 km || 
|-id=790 bgcolor=#E9E9E9
| 110790 ||  || — || October 16, 2001 || Socorro || LINEAR || — || align=right | 3.3 km || 
|-id=791 bgcolor=#E9E9E9
| 110791 ||  || — || October 16, 2001 || Socorro || LINEAR || ADE || align=right | 5.7 km || 
|-id=792 bgcolor=#E9E9E9
| 110792 ||  || — || October 16, 2001 || Socorro || LINEAR || DOR || align=right | 5.4 km || 
|-id=793 bgcolor=#E9E9E9
| 110793 ||  || — || October 16, 2001 || Socorro || LINEAR || — || align=right | 3.3 km || 
|-id=794 bgcolor=#E9E9E9
| 110794 ||  || — || October 16, 2001 || Socorro || LINEAR || — || align=right | 5.1 km || 
|-id=795 bgcolor=#E9E9E9
| 110795 ||  || — || October 17, 2001 || Socorro || LINEAR || EUN || align=right | 2.0 km || 
|-id=796 bgcolor=#E9E9E9
| 110796 ||  || — || October 17, 2001 || Socorro || LINEAR || WIT || align=right | 2.4 km || 
|-id=797 bgcolor=#d6d6d6
| 110797 ||  || — || October 17, 2001 || Socorro || LINEAR || HYG || align=right | 6.0 km || 
|-id=798 bgcolor=#E9E9E9
| 110798 ||  || — || October 17, 2001 || Socorro || LINEAR || — || align=right | 4.0 km || 
|-id=799 bgcolor=#E9E9E9
| 110799 ||  || — || October 17, 2001 || Socorro || LINEAR || HOF || align=right | 4.6 km || 
|-id=800 bgcolor=#E9E9E9
| 110800 ||  || — || October 17, 2001 || Socorro || LINEAR || — || align=right | 2.6 km || 
|}

110801–110900 

|-bgcolor=#E9E9E9
| 110801 ||  || — || October 17, 2001 || Socorro || LINEAR || — || align=right | 2.8 km || 
|-id=802 bgcolor=#d6d6d6
| 110802 ||  || — || October 17, 2001 || Socorro || LINEAR || — || align=right | 6.2 km || 
|-id=803 bgcolor=#E9E9E9
| 110803 ||  || — || October 17, 2001 || Socorro || LINEAR || — || align=right | 3.5 km || 
|-id=804 bgcolor=#E9E9E9
| 110804 ||  || — || October 17, 2001 || Socorro || LINEAR || — || align=right | 4.6 km || 
|-id=805 bgcolor=#E9E9E9
| 110805 ||  || — || October 17, 2001 || Socorro || LINEAR || INO || align=right | 2.6 km || 
|-id=806 bgcolor=#E9E9E9
| 110806 ||  || — || October 17, 2001 || Socorro || LINEAR || — || align=right | 4.5 km || 
|-id=807 bgcolor=#E9E9E9
| 110807 ||  || — || October 17, 2001 || Socorro || LINEAR || — || align=right | 2.8 km || 
|-id=808 bgcolor=#E9E9E9
| 110808 ||  || — || October 17, 2001 || Socorro || LINEAR || — || align=right | 4.2 km || 
|-id=809 bgcolor=#E9E9E9
| 110809 ||  || — || October 17, 2001 || Socorro || LINEAR || HEN || align=right | 2.2 km || 
|-id=810 bgcolor=#d6d6d6
| 110810 ||  || — || October 17, 2001 || Socorro || LINEAR || KOR || align=right | 2.6 km || 
|-id=811 bgcolor=#d6d6d6
| 110811 ||  || — || October 17, 2001 || Socorro || LINEAR || HYG || align=right | 5.9 km || 
|-id=812 bgcolor=#E9E9E9
| 110812 ||  || — || October 17, 2001 || Socorro || LINEAR || — || align=right | 2.0 km || 
|-id=813 bgcolor=#E9E9E9
| 110813 ||  || — || October 17, 2001 || Socorro || LINEAR || PAD || align=right | 3.9 km || 
|-id=814 bgcolor=#E9E9E9
| 110814 ||  || — || October 17, 2001 || Socorro || LINEAR || — || align=right | 4.7 km || 
|-id=815 bgcolor=#E9E9E9
| 110815 ||  || — || October 17, 2001 || Socorro || LINEAR || — || align=right | 3.1 km || 
|-id=816 bgcolor=#E9E9E9
| 110816 ||  || — || October 17, 2001 || Socorro || LINEAR || — || align=right | 3.7 km || 
|-id=817 bgcolor=#E9E9E9
| 110817 ||  || — || October 17, 2001 || Socorro || LINEAR || — || align=right | 3.8 km || 
|-id=818 bgcolor=#d6d6d6
| 110818 ||  || — || October 17, 2001 || Socorro || LINEAR || EMA || align=right | 7.3 km || 
|-id=819 bgcolor=#d6d6d6
| 110819 ||  || — || October 17, 2001 || Socorro || LINEAR || LIX || align=right | 8.0 km || 
|-id=820 bgcolor=#E9E9E9
| 110820 ||  || — || October 17, 2001 || Socorro || LINEAR || — || align=right | 5.5 km || 
|-id=821 bgcolor=#E9E9E9
| 110821 ||  || — || October 17, 2001 || Socorro || LINEAR || — || align=right | 3.4 km || 
|-id=822 bgcolor=#d6d6d6
| 110822 ||  || — || October 17, 2001 || Socorro || LINEAR || — || align=right | 8.3 km || 
|-id=823 bgcolor=#E9E9E9
| 110823 ||  || — || October 17, 2001 || Socorro || LINEAR || — || align=right | 3.2 km || 
|-id=824 bgcolor=#E9E9E9
| 110824 ||  || — || October 17, 2001 || Socorro || LINEAR || — || align=right | 3.9 km || 
|-id=825 bgcolor=#E9E9E9
| 110825 ||  || — || October 17, 2001 || Socorro || LINEAR || — || align=right | 3.7 km || 
|-id=826 bgcolor=#E9E9E9
| 110826 ||  || — || October 18, 2001 || Socorro || LINEAR || — || align=right | 2.0 km || 
|-id=827 bgcolor=#E9E9E9
| 110827 ||  || — || October 18, 2001 || Socorro || LINEAR || — || align=right | 5.0 km || 
|-id=828 bgcolor=#E9E9E9
| 110828 ||  || — || October 18, 2001 || Socorro || LINEAR || MAR || align=right | 2.1 km || 
|-id=829 bgcolor=#C2FFFF
| 110829 ||  || — || October 20, 2001 || Socorro || LINEAR || L5 || align=right | 11 km || 
|-id=830 bgcolor=#E9E9E9
| 110830 ||  || — || October 17, 2001 || Socorro || LINEAR || — || align=right | 3.3 km || 
|-id=831 bgcolor=#d6d6d6
| 110831 ||  || — || October 17, 2001 || Socorro || LINEAR || — || align=right | 4.1 km || 
|-id=832 bgcolor=#C2FFFF
| 110832 ||  || — || October 17, 2001 || Socorro || LINEAR || L5 || align=right | 14 km || 
|-id=833 bgcolor=#E9E9E9
| 110833 ||  || — || October 17, 2001 || Socorro || LINEAR || — || align=right | 2.8 km || 
|-id=834 bgcolor=#E9E9E9
| 110834 ||  || — || October 17, 2001 || Socorro || LINEAR || — || align=right | 3.0 km || 
|-id=835 bgcolor=#E9E9E9
| 110835 ||  || — || October 18, 2001 || Socorro || LINEAR || WIT || align=right | 2.6 km || 
|-id=836 bgcolor=#E9E9E9
| 110836 ||  || — || October 18, 2001 || Socorro || LINEAR || — || align=right | 4.5 km || 
|-id=837 bgcolor=#E9E9E9
| 110837 ||  || — || October 18, 2001 || Socorro || LINEAR || — || align=right | 4.2 km || 
|-id=838 bgcolor=#E9E9E9
| 110838 ||  || — || October 20, 2001 || Socorro || LINEAR || — || align=right | 1.9 km || 
|-id=839 bgcolor=#E9E9E9
| 110839 ||  || — || October 20, 2001 || Socorro || LINEAR || — || align=right | 3.4 km || 
|-id=840 bgcolor=#d6d6d6
| 110840 ||  || — || October 17, 2001 || Haleakala || NEAT || — || align=right | 6.4 km || 
|-id=841 bgcolor=#E9E9E9
| 110841 ||  || — || October 20, 2001 || Haleakala || NEAT || — || align=right | 3.4 km || 
|-id=842 bgcolor=#d6d6d6
| 110842 ||  || — || October 17, 2001 || Socorro || LINEAR || — || align=right | 5.3 km || 
|-id=843 bgcolor=#E9E9E9
| 110843 ||  || — || October 17, 2001 || Socorro || LINEAR || AGN || align=right | 2.1 km || 
|-id=844 bgcolor=#d6d6d6
| 110844 ||  || — || October 17, 2001 || Socorro || LINEAR || — || align=right | 6.7 km || 
|-id=845 bgcolor=#d6d6d6
| 110845 ||  || — || October 17, 2001 || Socorro || LINEAR || HYG || align=right | 6.4 km || 
|-id=846 bgcolor=#E9E9E9
| 110846 ||  || — || October 17, 2001 || Socorro || LINEAR || — || align=right | 3.5 km || 
|-id=847 bgcolor=#E9E9E9
| 110847 ||  || — || October 17, 2001 || Socorro || LINEAR || — || align=right | 2.0 km || 
|-id=848 bgcolor=#E9E9E9
| 110848 ||  || — || October 17, 2001 || Socorro || LINEAR || — || align=right | 3.1 km || 
|-id=849 bgcolor=#E9E9E9
| 110849 ||  || — || October 17, 2001 || Socorro || LINEAR || NEM || align=right | 4.5 km || 
|-id=850 bgcolor=#d6d6d6
| 110850 ||  || — || October 17, 2001 || Socorro || LINEAR || — || align=right | 3.6 km || 
|-id=851 bgcolor=#E9E9E9
| 110851 ||  || — || October 17, 2001 || Socorro || LINEAR || — || align=right | 2.1 km || 
|-id=852 bgcolor=#E9E9E9
| 110852 ||  || — || October 17, 2001 || Socorro || LINEAR || PAD || align=right | 3.8 km || 
|-id=853 bgcolor=#d6d6d6
| 110853 ||  || — || October 17, 2001 || Socorro || LINEAR || 3:2 || align=right | 10 km || 
|-id=854 bgcolor=#E9E9E9
| 110854 ||  || — || October 17, 2001 || Socorro || LINEAR || WIT || align=right | 2.4 km || 
|-id=855 bgcolor=#d6d6d6
| 110855 ||  || — || October 17, 2001 || Socorro || LINEAR || KOR || align=right | 2.6 km || 
|-id=856 bgcolor=#E9E9E9
| 110856 ||  || — || October 17, 2001 || Socorro || LINEAR || — || align=right | 2.9 km || 
|-id=857 bgcolor=#d6d6d6
| 110857 ||  || — || October 20, 2001 || Socorro || LINEAR || — || align=right | 3.9 km || 
|-id=858 bgcolor=#E9E9E9
| 110858 ||  || — || October 20, 2001 || Socorro || LINEAR || — || align=right | 1.5 km || 
|-id=859 bgcolor=#C2FFFF
| 110859 ||  || — || October 20, 2001 || Socorro || LINEAR || L5 || align=right | 13 km || 
|-id=860 bgcolor=#E9E9E9
| 110860 ||  || — || October 20, 2001 || Socorro || LINEAR || — || align=right | 3.0 km || 
|-id=861 bgcolor=#d6d6d6
| 110861 ||  || — || October 20, 2001 || Socorro || LINEAR || CHA || align=right | 4.4 km || 
|-id=862 bgcolor=#E9E9E9
| 110862 ||  || — || October 20, 2001 || Socorro || LINEAR || — || align=right | 3.5 km || 
|-id=863 bgcolor=#E9E9E9
| 110863 ||  || — || October 16, 2001 || Kitt Peak || Spacewatch || — || align=right | 2.0 km || 
|-id=864 bgcolor=#E9E9E9
| 110864 ||  || — || October 22, 2001 || Palomar || NEAT || EUN || align=right | 3.8 km || 
|-id=865 bgcolor=#E9E9E9
| 110865 ||  || — || October 22, 2001 || Palomar || NEAT || — || align=right | 3.6 km || 
|-id=866 bgcolor=#E9E9E9
| 110866 ||  || — || October 23, 2001 || Kitt Peak || Spacewatch || — || align=right | 2.4 km || 
|-id=867 bgcolor=#E9E9E9
| 110867 ||  || — || October 19, 2001 || Haleakala || NEAT || — || align=right | 3.0 km || 
|-id=868 bgcolor=#d6d6d6
| 110868 ||  || — || October 19, 2001 || Haleakala || NEAT || — || align=right | 6.3 km || 
|-id=869 bgcolor=#E9E9E9
| 110869 ||  || — || October 19, 2001 || Haleakala || NEAT || EUN || align=right | 1.7 km || 
|-id=870 bgcolor=#E9E9E9
| 110870 ||  || — || October 19, 2001 || Haleakala || NEAT || — || align=right | 4.6 km || 
|-id=871 bgcolor=#d6d6d6
| 110871 ||  || — || October 19, 2001 || Haleakala || NEAT || TIR || align=right | 6.0 km || 
|-id=872 bgcolor=#d6d6d6
| 110872 ||  || — || October 19, 2001 || Haleakala || NEAT || EOS || align=right | 4.2 km || 
|-id=873 bgcolor=#E9E9E9
| 110873 ||  || — || October 19, 2001 || Haleakala || NEAT || ADE || align=right | 4.4 km || 
|-id=874 bgcolor=#d6d6d6
| 110874 ||  || — || October 17, 2001 || Socorro || LINEAR || — || align=right | 4.5 km || 
|-id=875 bgcolor=#E9E9E9
| 110875 ||  || — || October 17, 2001 || Socorro || LINEAR || — || align=right | 2.4 km || 
|-id=876 bgcolor=#E9E9E9
| 110876 ||  || — || October 17, 2001 || Socorro || LINEAR || — || align=right | 5.0 km || 
|-id=877 bgcolor=#d6d6d6
| 110877 ||  || — || October 17, 2001 || Socorro || LINEAR || 628 || align=right | 2.7 km || 
|-id=878 bgcolor=#E9E9E9
| 110878 ||  || — || October 17, 2001 || Socorro || LINEAR || — || align=right | 3.4 km || 
|-id=879 bgcolor=#E9E9E9
| 110879 ||  || — || October 17, 2001 || Socorro || LINEAR || — || align=right | 1.8 km || 
|-id=880 bgcolor=#E9E9E9
| 110880 ||  || — || October 20, 2001 || Socorro || LINEAR || — || align=right | 1.6 km || 
|-id=881 bgcolor=#E9E9E9
| 110881 ||  || — || October 20, 2001 || Socorro || LINEAR || — || align=right | 2.6 km || 
|-id=882 bgcolor=#d6d6d6
| 110882 ||  || — || October 20, 2001 || Socorro || LINEAR || KOR || align=right | 2.3 km || 
|-id=883 bgcolor=#d6d6d6
| 110883 ||  || — || October 20, 2001 || Socorro || LINEAR || — || align=right | 4.9 km || 
|-id=884 bgcolor=#d6d6d6
| 110884 ||  || — || October 20, 2001 || Socorro || LINEAR || — || align=right | 5.2 km || 
|-id=885 bgcolor=#d6d6d6
| 110885 ||  || — || October 20, 2001 || Socorro || LINEAR || — || align=right | 4.1 km || 
|-id=886 bgcolor=#E9E9E9
| 110886 ||  || — || October 21, 2001 || Socorro || LINEAR || — || align=right | 1.9 km || 
|-id=887 bgcolor=#E9E9E9
| 110887 ||  || — || October 21, 2001 || Socorro || LINEAR || AGN || align=right | 2.2 km || 
|-id=888 bgcolor=#E9E9E9
| 110888 ||  || — || October 21, 2001 || Socorro || LINEAR || — || align=right | 4.4 km || 
|-id=889 bgcolor=#fefefe
| 110889 ||  || — || October 21, 2001 || Socorro || LINEAR || FLO || align=right | 1.1 km || 
|-id=890 bgcolor=#E9E9E9
| 110890 ||  || — || October 21, 2001 || Socorro || LINEAR || — || align=right | 3.2 km || 
|-id=891 bgcolor=#E9E9E9
| 110891 ||  || — || October 21, 2001 || Socorro || LINEAR || — || align=right | 3.7 km || 
|-id=892 bgcolor=#fefefe
| 110892 ||  || — || October 22, 2001 || Socorro || LINEAR || — || align=right | 2.9 km || 
|-id=893 bgcolor=#d6d6d6
| 110893 ||  || — || October 22, 2001 || Socorro || LINEAR || KOR || align=right | 2.7 km || 
|-id=894 bgcolor=#d6d6d6
| 110894 ||  || — || October 22, 2001 || Socorro || LINEAR || — || align=right | 4.7 km || 
|-id=895 bgcolor=#E9E9E9
| 110895 ||  || — || October 22, 2001 || Socorro || LINEAR || — || align=right | 3.2 km || 
|-id=896 bgcolor=#E9E9E9
| 110896 ||  || — || October 22, 2001 || Socorro || LINEAR || WIT || align=right | 2.0 km || 
|-id=897 bgcolor=#E9E9E9
| 110897 ||  || — || October 22, 2001 || Socorro || LINEAR || HEN || align=right | 1.8 km || 
|-id=898 bgcolor=#E9E9E9
| 110898 ||  || — || October 22, 2001 || Socorro || LINEAR || — || align=right | 4.3 km || 
|-id=899 bgcolor=#E9E9E9
| 110899 ||  || — || October 22, 2001 || Socorro || LINEAR || — || align=right | 3.0 km || 
|-id=900 bgcolor=#E9E9E9
| 110900 ||  || — || October 22, 2001 || Socorro || LINEAR || — || align=right | 3.4 km || 
|}

110901–111000 

|-bgcolor=#d6d6d6
| 110901 ||  || — || October 22, 2001 || Socorro || LINEAR || — || align=right | 4.3 km || 
|-id=902 bgcolor=#E9E9E9
| 110902 ||  || — || October 22, 2001 || Socorro || LINEAR || — || align=right | 2.1 km || 
|-id=903 bgcolor=#E9E9E9
| 110903 ||  || — || October 22, 2001 || Socorro || LINEAR || — || align=right | 2.6 km || 
|-id=904 bgcolor=#E9E9E9
| 110904 ||  || — || October 22, 2001 || Socorro || LINEAR || — || align=right | 4.6 km || 
|-id=905 bgcolor=#d6d6d6
| 110905 ||  || — || October 22, 2001 || Socorro || LINEAR || — || align=right | 7.6 km || 
|-id=906 bgcolor=#E9E9E9
| 110906 ||  || — || October 22, 2001 || Socorro || LINEAR || HEN || align=right | 2.4 km || 
|-id=907 bgcolor=#d6d6d6
| 110907 ||  || — || October 22, 2001 || Socorro || LINEAR || — || align=right | 5.1 km || 
|-id=908 bgcolor=#E9E9E9
| 110908 ||  || — || October 22, 2001 || Palomar || NEAT || — || align=right | 2.0 km || 
|-id=909 bgcolor=#E9E9E9
| 110909 ||  || — || October 22, 2001 || Palomar || NEAT || ADE || align=right | 4.4 km || 
|-id=910 bgcolor=#E9E9E9
| 110910 ||  || — || October 22, 2001 || Palomar || NEAT || AER || align=right | 2.6 km || 
|-id=911 bgcolor=#d6d6d6
| 110911 ||  || — || October 22, 2001 || Palomar || NEAT || — || align=right | 4.7 km || 
|-id=912 bgcolor=#E9E9E9
| 110912 ||  || — || October 23, 2001 || Palomar || NEAT || — || align=right | 5.0 km || 
|-id=913 bgcolor=#E9E9E9
| 110913 ||  || — || October 23, 2001 || Palomar || NEAT || — || align=right | 4.9 km || 
|-id=914 bgcolor=#E9E9E9
| 110914 ||  || — || October 17, 2001 || Socorro || LINEAR || — || align=right | 3.5 km || 
|-id=915 bgcolor=#E9E9E9
| 110915 ||  || — || October 20, 2001 || Socorro || LINEAR || PAD || align=right | 4.0 km || 
|-id=916 bgcolor=#E9E9E9
| 110916 ||  || — || October 21, 2001 || Socorro || LINEAR || EUN || align=right | 2.6 km || 
|-id=917 bgcolor=#E9E9E9
| 110917 ||  || — || October 22, 2001 || Socorro || LINEAR || VIB || align=right | 4.8 km || 
|-id=918 bgcolor=#d6d6d6
| 110918 ||  || — || October 22, 2001 || Socorro || LINEAR || — || align=right | 6.4 km || 
|-id=919 bgcolor=#E9E9E9
| 110919 ||  || — || October 23, 2001 || Socorro || LINEAR || — || align=right | 3.6 km || 
|-id=920 bgcolor=#E9E9E9
| 110920 ||  || — || October 23, 2001 || Socorro || LINEAR || — || align=right | 3.0 km || 
|-id=921 bgcolor=#d6d6d6
| 110921 ||  || — || October 23, 2001 || Socorro || LINEAR || HIL3:2 || align=right | 8.5 km || 
|-id=922 bgcolor=#E9E9E9
| 110922 ||  || — || October 23, 2001 || Socorro || LINEAR || — || align=right | 3.1 km || 
|-id=923 bgcolor=#E9E9E9
| 110923 ||  || — || October 23, 2001 || Socorro || LINEAR || ADE || align=right | 3.5 km || 
|-id=924 bgcolor=#d6d6d6
| 110924 ||  || — || October 23, 2001 || Socorro || LINEAR || — || align=right | 4.5 km || 
|-id=925 bgcolor=#E9E9E9
| 110925 ||  || — || October 23, 2001 || Socorro || LINEAR || — || align=right | 2.9 km || 
|-id=926 bgcolor=#E9E9E9
| 110926 ||  || — || October 23, 2001 || Socorro || LINEAR || — || align=right | 2.5 km || 
|-id=927 bgcolor=#E9E9E9
| 110927 ||  || — || October 23, 2001 || Socorro || LINEAR || HEN || align=right | 1.8 km || 
|-id=928 bgcolor=#d6d6d6
| 110928 ||  || — || October 23, 2001 || Socorro || LINEAR || — || align=right | 4.4 km || 
|-id=929 bgcolor=#fefefe
| 110929 ||  || — || October 23, 2001 || Socorro || LINEAR || NYS || align=right | 1.5 km || 
|-id=930 bgcolor=#d6d6d6
| 110930 ||  || — || October 23, 2001 || Socorro || LINEAR || — || align=right | 3.4 km || 
|-id=931 bgcolor=#E9E9E9
| 110931 ||  || — || October 23, 2001 || Socorro || LINEAR || NEM || align=right | 4.4 km || 
|-id=932 bgcolor=#E9E9E9
| 110932 ||  || — || October 23, 2001 || Socorro || LINEAR || — || align=right | 4.6 km || 
|-id=933 bgcolor=#E9E9E9
| 110933 ||  || — || October 23, 2001 || Socorro || LINEAR || — || align=right | 3.2 km || 
|-id=934 bgcolor=#E9E9E9
| 110934 ||  || — || October 23, 2001 || Socorro || LINEAR || — || align=right | 3.3 km || 
|-id=935 bgcolor=#d6d6d6
| 110935 ||  || — || October 23, 2001 || Socorro || LINEAR || — || align=right | 4.5 km || 
|-id=936 bgcolor=#E9E9E9
| 110936 ||  || — || October 23, 2001 || Socorro || LINEAR || HEN || align=right | 2.5 km || 
|-id=937 bgcolor=#E9E9E9
| 110937 ||  || — || October 23, 2001 || Socorro || LINEAR || — || align=right | 3.6 km || 
|-id=938 bgcolor=#E9E9E9
| 110938 ||  || — || October 23, 2001 || Socorro || LINEAR || — || align=right | 2.2 km || 
|-id=939 bgcolor=#E9E9E9
| 110939 ||  || — || October 23, 2001 || Socorro || LINEAR || — || align=right | 5.4 km || 
|-id=940 bgcolor=#E9E9E9
| 110940 ||  || — || October 23, 2001 || Socorro || LINEAR || GEF || align=right | 3.5 km || 
|-id=941 bgcolor=#E9E9E9
| 110941 ||  || — || October 23, 2001 || Socorro || LINEAR || — || align=right | 2.7 km || 
|-id=942 bgcolor=#E9E9E9
| 110942 ||  || — || October 23, 2001 || Socorro || LINEAR || AGN || align=right | 2.2 km || 
|-id=943 bgcolor=#E9E9E9
| 110943 ||  || — || October 23, 2001 || Socorro || LINEAR || — || align=right | 5.0 km || 
|-id=944 bgcolor=#E9E9E9
| 110944 ||  || — || October 23, 2001 || Socorro || LINEAR || — || align=right | 4.3 km || 
|-id=945 bgcolor=#E9E9E9
| 110945 ||  || — || October 23, 2001 || Socorro || LINEAR || GEF || align=right | 2.2 km || 
|-id=946 bgcolor=#E9E9E9
| 110946 ||  || — || October 23, 2001 || Socorro || LINEAR || — || align=right | 3.1 km || 
|-id=947 bgcolor=#E9E9E9
| 110947 ||  || — || October 23, 2001 || Socorro || LINEAR || — || align=right | 3.6 km || 
|-id=948 bgcolor=#E9E9E9
| 110948 ||  || — || October 23, 2001 || Socorro || LINEAR || — || align=right | 3.4 km || 
|-id=949 bgcolor=#d6d6d6
| 110949 ||  || — || October 23, 2001 || Socorro || LINEAR || THM || align=right | 5.0 km || 
|-id=950 bgcolor=#d6d6d6
| 110950 ||  || — || October 23, 2001 || Socorro || LINEAR || KOR || align=right | 2.2 km || 
|-id=951 bgcolor=#E9E9E9
| 110951 ||  || — || October 23, 2001 || Socorro || LINEAR || — || align=right | 3.8 km || 
|-id=952 bgcolor=#d6d6d6
| 110952 ||  || — || October 23, 2001 || Socorro || LINEAR || KOR || align=right | 3.2 km || 
|-id=953 bgcolor=#E9E9E9
| 110953 ||  || — || October 23, 2001 || Socorro || LINEAR || — || align=right | 5.3 km || 
|-id=954 bgcolor=#d6d6d6
| 110954 ||  || — || October 17, 2001 || Palomar || NEAT || — || align=right | 7.7 km || 
|-id=955 bgcolor=#E9E9E9
| 110955 ||  || — || October 23, 2001 || Palomar || NEAT || — || align=right | 2.0 km || 
|-id=956 bgcolor=#E9E9E9
| 110956 ||  || — || October 23, 2001 || Palomar || NEAT || — || align=right | 2.9 km || 
|-id=957 bgcolor=#E9E9E9
| 110957 ||  || — || October 23, 2001 || Palomar || NEAT || — || align=right | 1.5 km || 
|-id=958 bgcolor=#E9E9E9
| 110958 ||  || — || October 19, 2001 || Socorro || LINEAR || — || align=right | 4.0 km || 
|-id=959 bgcolor=#E9E9E9
| 110959 ||  || — || October 19, 2001 || Socorro || LINEAR || — || align=right | 4.5 km || 
|-id=960 bgcolor=#E9E9E9
| 110960 ||  || — || October 19, 2001 || Socorro || LINEAR || — || align=right | 7.4 km || 
|-id=961 bgcolor=#d6d6d6
| 110961 ||  || — || October 19, 2001 || Socorro || LINEAR || TIR || align=right | 8.0 km || 
|-id=962 bgcolor=#E9E9E9
| 110962 ||  || — || October 19, 2001 || Socorro || LINEAR || HNS || align=right | 3.0 km || 
|-id=963 bgcolor=#E9E9E9
| 110963 ||  || — || October 21, 2001 || Socorro || LINEAR || — || align=right | 3.7 km || 
|-id=964 bgcolor=#d6d6d6
| 110964 ||  || — || October 21, 2001 || Socorro || LINEAR || KOR || align=right | 2.4 km || 
|-id=965 bgcolor=#E9E9E9
| 110965 ||  || — || October 21, 2001 || Socorro || LINEAR || AGN || align=right | 2.6 km || 
|-id=966 bgcolor=#d6d6d6
| 110966 ||  || — || October 23, 2001 || Socorro || LINEAR || SYL7:4 || align=right | 6.9 km || 
|-id=967 bgcolor=#E9E9E9
| 110967 ||  || — || October 18, 2001 || Palomar || NEAT || — || align=right | 2.6 km || 
|-id=968 bgcolor=#d6d6d6
| 110968 ||  || — || October 18, 2001 || Palomar || NEAT || THM || align=right | 5.3 km || 
|-id=969 bgcolor=#E9E9E9
| 110969 ||  || — || October 21, 2001 || Socorro || LINEAR || — || align=right | 2.2 km || 
|-id=970 bgcolor=#E9E9E9
| 110970 ||  || — || October 21, 2001 || Socorro || LINEAR || — || align=right | 2.1 km || 
|-id=971 bgcolor=#E9E9E9
| 110971 ||  || — || October 21, 2001 || Socorro || LINEAR || — || align=right | 4.1 km || 
|-id=972 bgcolor=#d6d6d6
| 110972 ||  || — || October 23, 2001 || Palomar || NEAT || — || align=right | 7.2 km || 
|-id=973 bgcolor=#E9E9E9
| 110973 ||  || — || October 23, 2001 || Palomar || NEAT || PAE || align=right | 6.4 km || 
|-id=974 bgcolor=#E9E9E9
| 110974 ||  || — || October 26, 2001 || Haleakala || NEAT || — || align=right | 4.5 km || 
|-id=975 bgcolor=#E9E9E9
| 110975 ||  || — || October 26, 2001 || Haleakala || NEAT || — || align=right | 3.9 km || 
|-id=976 bgcolor=#d6d6d6
| 110976 ||  || — || October 16, 2001 || Palomar || NEAT || — || align=right | 5.6 km || 
|-id=977 bgcolor=#E9E9E9
| 110977 ||  || — || October 16, 2001 || Palomar || NEAT || — || align=right | 1.9 km || 
|-id=978 bgcolor=#E9E9E9
| 110978 ||  || — || October 16, 2001 || Socorro || LINEAR || — || align=right | 4.1 km || 
|-id=979 bgcolor=#E9E9E9
| 110979 ||  || — || October 17, 2001 || Palomar || NEAT || — || align=right | 1.7 km || 
|-id=980 bgcolor=#E9E9E9
| 110980 ||  || — || October 17, 2001 || Socorro || LINEAR || — || align=right | 4.7 km || 
|-id=981 bgcolor=#E9E9E9
| 110981 ||  || — || October 17, 2001 || Socorro || LINEAR || — || align=right | 3.9 km || 
|-id=982 bgcolor=#d6d6d6
| 110982 ||  || — || October 18, 2001 || Socorro || LINEAR || — || align=right | 7.7 km || 
|-id=983 bgcolor=#d6d6d6
| 110983 ||  || — || October 18, 2001 || Socorro || LINEAR || — || align=right | 7.9 km || 
|-id=984 bgcolor=#E9E9E9
| 110984 ||  || — || October 18, 2001 || Palomar || NEAT || — || align=right | 2.0 km || 
|-id=985 bgcolor=#E9E9E9
| 110985 ||  || — || October 18, 2001 || Socorro || LINEAR || — || align=right | 3.0 km || 
|-id=986 bgcolor=#E9E9E9
| 110986 ||  || — || October 18, 2001 || Socorro || LINEAR || AER || align=right | 3.2 km || 
|-id=987 bgcolor=#E9E9E9
| 110987 ||  || — || October 18, 2001 || Socorro || LINEAR || MAR || align=right | 2.1 km || 
|-id=988 bgcolor=#E9E9E9
| 110988 ||  || — || October 18, 2001 || Socorro || LINEAR || EUN || align=right | 1.7 km || 
|-id=989 bgcolor=#d6d6d6
| 110989 ||  || — || October 19, 2001 || Socorro || LINEAR || — || align=right | 6.7 km || 
|-id=990 bgcolor=#E9E9E9
| 110990 ||  || — || October 19, 2001 || Palomar || NEAT || — || align=right | 3.5 km || 
|-id=991 bgcolor=#E9E9E9
| 110991 ||  || — || October 19, 2001 || Palomar || NEAT || — || align=right | 4.3 km || 
|-id=992 bgcolor=#E9E9E9
| 110992 ||  || — || October 19, 2001 || Palomar || NEAT || — || align=right | 2.2 km || 
|-id=993 bgcolor=#E9E9E9
| 110993 ||  || — || October 19, 2001 || Palomar || NEAT || — || align=right | 3.9 km || 
|-id=994 bgcolor=#E9E9E9
| 110994 ||  || — || October 22, 2001 || Palomar || NEAT || MIT || align=right | 4.5 km || 
|-id=995 bgcolor=#E9E9E9
| 110995 ||  || — || October 22, 2001 || Palomar || NEAT || — || align=right | 2.5 km || 
|-id=996 bgcolor=#E9E9E9
| 110996 ||  || — || October 23, 2001 || Anderson Mesa || LONEOS || — || align=right | 2.8 km || 
|-id=997 bgcolor=#d6d6d6
| 110997 ||  || — || October 24, 2001 || Kitt Peak || Spacewatch || — || align=right | 3.7 km || 
|-id=998 bgcolor=#E9E9E9
| 110998 ||  || — || October 20, 2001 || Haleakala || NEAT || — || align=right | 4.4 km || 
|-id=999 bgcolor=#E9E9E9
| 110999 ||  || — || October 16, 2001 || Socorro || LINEAR || — || align=right | 5.4 km || 
|-id=000 bgcolor=#d6d6d6
| 111000 ||  || — || October 17, 2001 || Socorro || LINEAR || — || align=right | 6.0 km || 
|}

References

External links 
 Discovery Circumstances: Numbered Minor Planets (110001)–(115000) (IAU Minor Planet Center)

0110